= List of Falcon 9 and Falcon Heavy launches =

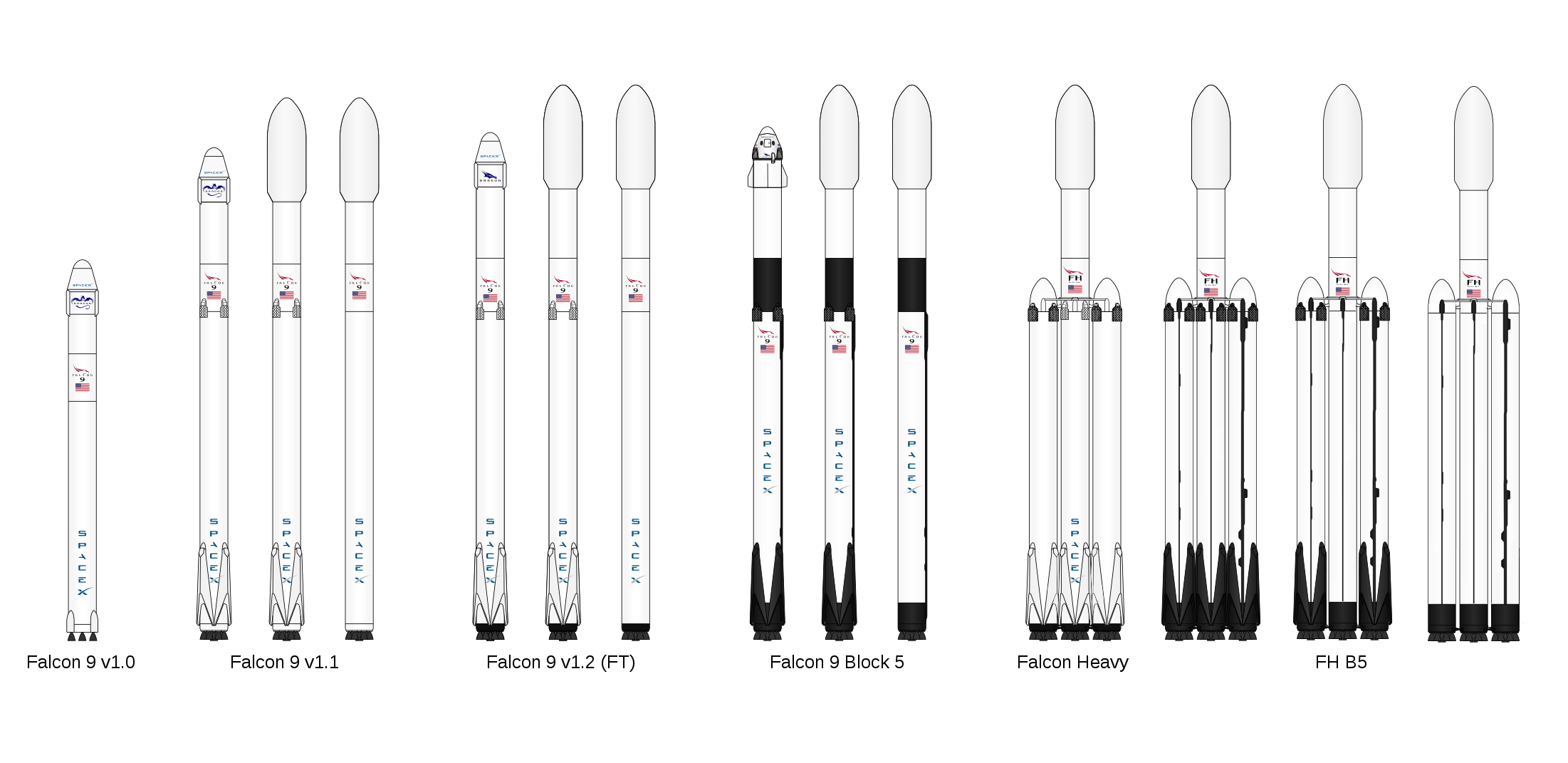
Left to right: Falcon 9 v1.0, v1.1, v1.2 "Full Thrust", Falcon 9 Block 5, Falcon Heavy, and Falcon Heavy Block 5.

As of November 21, 2026, rockets from the Falcon 9 family have been launched 717 times, with 714 full mission successes, two mission failures during launch, (Note: SpaceX CRS-7 and Starlink 9-3) one mission failure before launch, (Note: The AMOS-6 spacecraft was destroyed in a static fire test before its planned launch; the mission is counted as a failure but not as a launch.) and one partial failure. (Note: SpaceX CRS-1)

Designed and operated by SpaceX, the Falcon 9 family includes the retired versions Falcon 9 v1.0, launched five times from June 2010 to March 2013; Falcon 9 v1.1, launched 15 times from September 2013 to January 2016; and Falcon 9 v1.2 "Full Thrust" (blocks 3 and 4), launched 36 times from December 2015 to June 2018. The active "Full Thrust" variant Falcon 9 Block 5 has launched 647 times since May 2018. Falcon Heavy, a heavy-lift derivative of Falcon 9, combining a strengthened central core with two Falcon 9 first stages as side boosters has launched 14 times since February 2018.

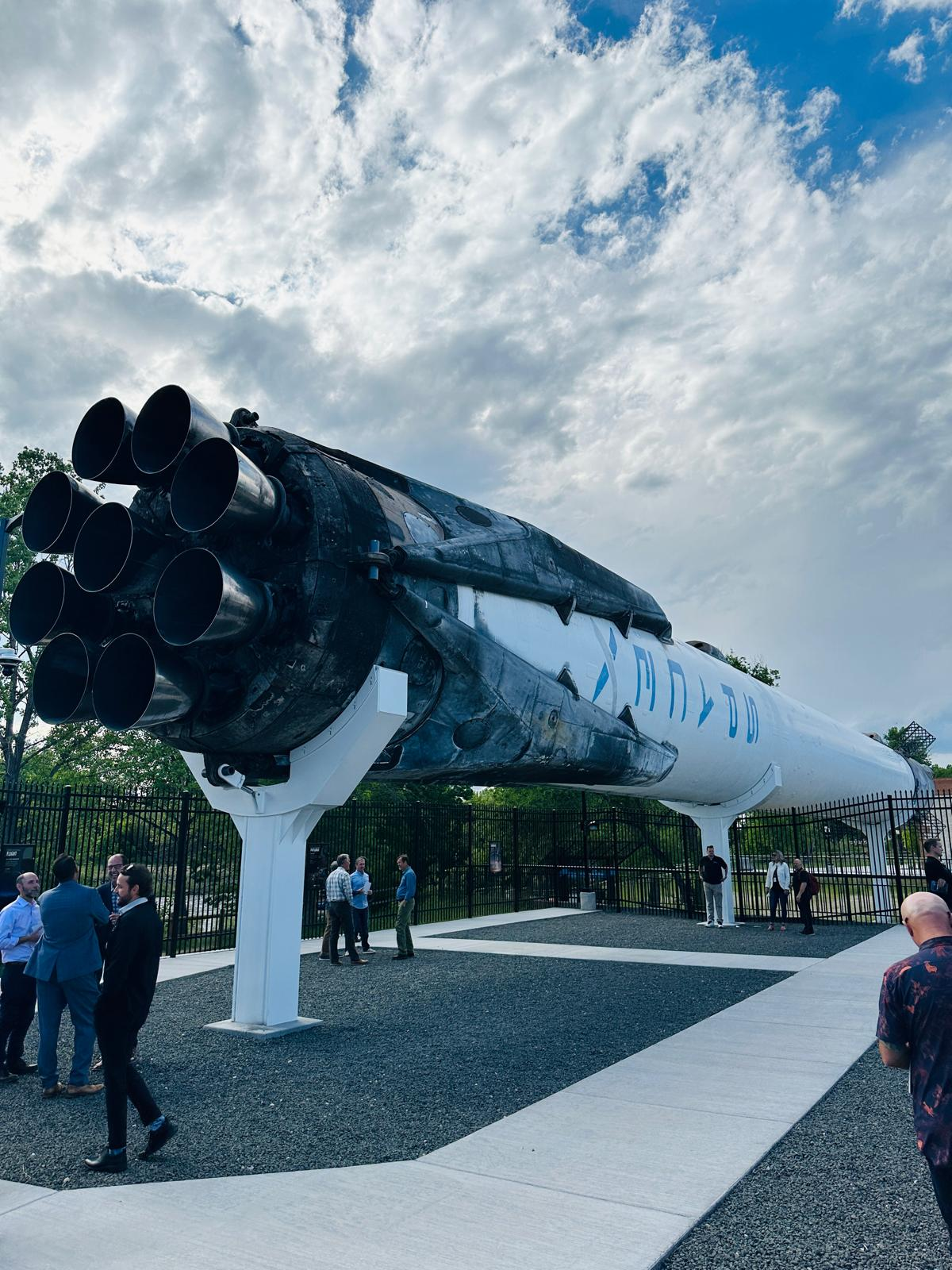
Falcon 9 at Dish Network's Littleton, Colorado office.

The Falcon design features reusable first-stage boosters, which land either on a ground pad near the launch site or on a drone ship at sea. In December 2015, Falcon 9 became the first rocket to land propulsively after delivering a payload into orbit. This reusability results in significantly reduced launch costs, as the cost of the first stage constitutes the majority of the cost of a new rocket. Falcon family boosters have successfully landed 676 times in 689 attempts. A total of 56 boosters have flown multiple missions, with a record of 37 missions by a booster, B1067. SpaceX has also reflown fairing halves more than 300 times, with SN168 (40 times; the most reflown rocket stage to space) and SN155 (40 times) being the most reflown passive and active fairing halves respectively.

Typical missions include launches of SpaceX's Starlink satellites (accounting for a majority of the Falcon manifest since January 2020), Dragon crew and cargo missions to the International Space Station, and launches of commercial and military satellites to LEO, polar, and geosynchronous orbits. The heaviest payload launched on Falcon is a batch of 24 Starlink V2-Mini satellites weighing about 17,500 kg (38,600 lb) total, first flown in February 2024, landing on JRTI. The heaviest payload launched to geostationary transfer orbit (GTO) was the 9,200 kg (20,300 lb) Jupiter-3 on July 29, 2023. Launches to higher orbits have included DSCOVR and IMAP to Sun–Earth Lagrange point L_{1}, TESS to a lunar flyby, a Tesla Roadster demonstration payload to a heliocentric orbit extending past the orbit of Mars, DART and Hera to the asteroid Didymos, Euclid to Sun-Earth Lagrange point L_{2}, Psyche to the asteroid 16 Psyche, and Europa Clipper to Europa (a moon of Jupiter).

== Launch statistics ==
Rockets from the Falcon 9 family have a success rate of 99.58% and have been launched 717 times over 16 years, resulting in 714 full successes, two in-flight failures (SpaceX CRS-7 and Starlink Group 9–3), one pre-flight failure (AMOS-6 while being prepared for an on-pad static fire test), and one partial failure (SpaceX CRS-1, which delivered its cargo to the International Space Station (ISS), but a secondary payload was stranded in a lower-than-planned orbit). The active version of the rocket, the Falcon 9 Block 5, has flown 646 times successfully and failed once (Starlink Group 9–3), resulting in a 99.85% success rate.

In 2022, the Falcon 9 set a new record with 60 successful launches by the same launch vehicle type in a calendar year. This surpassed the previous record held by Soyuz-U, which had 47 launches (45 successful) in 1979. In 2023, the Falcon family of rockets (including the Falcon Heavy) had 96 successful launches, surpassing the 63 launches (61 successful) of the R-7 rocket family in 1980. (Note: There was also an on-pad explosion of an R-7 family rocket; sometimes it is counted as a launch, resulting in 64 launches.) In 2024, SpaceX broke their own record with 134 total Falcon flights (133 successful) accounting for over half of all orbital launches that year. In 2025, SpaceX broke their own record again with 165 total Falcon flights (165 successful).

The Falcon 9 has evolved through several versions: v1.0 was launched five times from 2010 to 2013, v1.1 launched 15 times from 2013 to 2016, Full Thrust launched 36 times from 2015 to 2018. The most recent version, Block 5, was introduced in May 2018. With each iteration, the Falcon 9 boosters have become more powerful and capable of vertical landing, while fairings simultaneously performing water landing, before being scooped out of water. As vertical landings and fairing recovery operations became more commonplace, SpaceX focused on streamlining the refurbishment process for boosters and fairings, making it faster and more cost-effective.

The Falcon Heavy derivative is a heavy-lift launch vehicle composed of three Falcon 9 first-stage boosters. The central core is reinforced, while the side boosters feature aerodynamic nosecone instead of the usual interstage.

Falcon 9 first-stage boosters landed successfully in 676 of 689 attempts (98.11%), with 651 out of 657 (99.09%) for the Falcon 9 Block 5 version. A total of 649 re-flights of first stage boosters have all successfully launched their second stages and, all but one, their payloads.

=== Rocket configurations ===
- Falcon 9 v1.0
- Falcon 9 v1.1
- Falcon 9 Full Thrust
- Falcon 9 FT (reused)
- Falcon 9 Block 5
- Falcon 9 Block 5 (reused)
- Falcon Heavy

=== Launch sites ===
- Cape Canaveral, SLC-40
- Kennedy, LC-39A
- Vandenberg, SLC-4E

=== Launch outcomes ===
- Loss before launch
- Loss during flight
- Partial failure
- Success (commercial and government)
- Success (Starlink)
- Planned (commercial and government)
- Planned (Starlink)

=== Booster landings ===
- Ground-pad failure
- Drone-ship failure
- Ocean test failure (Note: Controlled descent; ocean touchdown control failed; no recovery)
- Parachute test failure (Note: Passive reentry failed before parachute deployment)
- Ground-pad success
- Drone-ship success
- Ocean test success (Note: Controlled descent; soft vertical ocean touchdown; no recovery)
- No attempt

== Past launches ==
=== 2010 to 2019 ===
From June 2010, to the end of 2019, Falcon 9 was launched 77 times, with 75 full mission successes, one partial failure and one total loss of the spacecraft. In addition, one rocket and its payload were destroyed on the launch pad during the fueling process before a static fire test was set to occur. Falcon Heavy was launched three times, all successful.

The first Falcon 9 version, Falcon 9 v1.0, was launched five times from June 2010, to March 2013, its successor Falcon 9 v1.1 15 times from September 2013, to January 2016, and the Falcon 9 Full Thrust (through Block 4) 36 times from December 2015, to June 2018. The latest Full Thrust variant, Block 5, was introduced in May 2018, and launched 21 times before the end of 2019.

=== 2020 to 2022 ===
From January 2020, to the end of 2022, Falcon 9 was launched 117 times, all successful, and landed boosters successfully on 111 of 114 attempts. Falcon Heavy was launched once and was successful, including landing of the mission's two side boosters.

=== 2023 ===
SpaceX conducted 96 Falcon family vehicle launches (91 Falcon 9 and 5 Falcon Heavy) in 2023. It surpassed both the company's own single-year launch record of 61 and the global annual record of 64 launches, coming close to its previously announced goal of 100 Falcon launches in the year. (Note: While not reaching the goal of 100 launches in a calendar year, SpaceX completed 100 launches in 365 days between December 8, 2022, 22:27 UTC and December 8, 2023, 8:03 UTC.)

The company's payload delivery capacity also rose, with approximately 1,200 tonnes (2,600,000 lb) sent to orbit.

=== 2024 ===
SpaceX conducted 134 Falcon family vehicle launches (132 Falcon 9 and 2 Falcon Heavy) in 2024, including the failed Starlink Group 9-3 mission. It again broke the global single-year launch record of 98 launches in a year (set by SpaceX in the previous year with 96 Falcon and 2 Starship launches).

The company had set initial launch targets for the year of approximately 144 launches, or an average of 12 per month, accounting for potential delays due to weather, technical issues, and scheduled maintenance. However, subsequent statements from SpaceX leadership indicated a potential increase to 148 launches, an average of 13 launches per month. Later in November 2024, due to launch or recovery failures leading to several mishap investigations and delays, SpaceX leadership lowered the year's launch projections to approximately 136 launches in the year, which was subsequently missed by two launches.

The company's payload delivery capacity also rose, with more than 1,498 tonnes (3,303,000 lb) (only 85.5% of the launches were reported launch masses) sent to orbit.

=== 2025 ===
SpaceX conducted 165 Falcon 9 launches in 2025, a new annual launch record, and sending an estimated 2,400 tonnes (5,300,000 lb) to orbit.

In November 2024, the company outlined ambitious launch targets for the year, with initial projections of more than 150 launches, or an average of 12 to 13 per month, accounting for potential delays due to weather, technical issues, and scheduled maintenance. Later, in December, SpaceX President Gwynne Shotwell stated they were expecting 175 to 180 launches in 2025, or an average of 14 to 15 per month. Later they reduced the target to 170 launches in the year and further to 165 launches in the year or an average of 13 to 14 launches per month.

Flight No.	Date and time (UTC)	Version, booster (Note: Falcon 9 first-stage boosters have a four-digit serial number. A hyphen followed by a number indicates the flight count. For example, B1021‑1 and B1021‑2 represent the first and second flights of booster B1021. Boosters without a hyphen were expended on their first flight. Additionally, missions where boosters are making their first flight are shown with a mint-colored background.)	Launch site	Payload (Note: Dragon spacecraft have a three-digit serial number. A hyphen followed by a number indicates the flight count. For example, C106‑1 and C106‑2 represent the first and second flights of Dragon C106.)	Payload mass	Orbit	Customer	Launch outcome	Booster landing
418	January 4, 2025; 01:27	F9 B5; B1073‑20	Cape Canaveral, SLC‑40	Thuraya 4-NGS	5,000 kg (11,000 lb)	GTO	Thuraya	Success	Success (ASOG)
418	Planned replacement for Thuraya 2 and 3.								
419	January 6, 2025; 20:43	F9 B5; B1077‑17	Cape Canaveral, SLC‑40	Starlink: Group 6‑71	~17,500 kg (38,600 lb)	LEO	SpaceX	Success	Success (JRTI)
419	Launch of 24 Starlink v2 mini satellites to a 559 km (347 mi) orbit at an inclination of 43° to expand internet constellation. 1st time flying a fairing half for the 23rd time.								
420	January 8, 2025; 15:27	F9 B5; B1086‑3	Kennedy, LC‑39A	Starlink: Group 12-11 (21 satellites)	~16,500 kg (36,400 lb)	LEO	SpaceX	Success	Success (ASOG)
420	Launch of 21 Starlink v2 mini satellites, including 13 with direct-to-cell connectivity, to a 559 km (347 mi) orbit at an inclination of 43° to expand internet constellation.								
421	January 10, 2025; 03:53	F9 B5; B1071‑22	Vandenberg, SLC‑4E	NROL-153 (22 Starshield satellites)	Unknown	LEO	NRO	Success	Success (OCISLY)
421	Seventh launch of SpaceX/Northrop Grumman-built satellites for the National Reconnaissance Office.								
422	January 10, 2025; 19:11	F9 B5; B1067‑25	Cape Canaveral, SLC‑40	Starlink: Group 12-12 (21 satellites)	~16,500 kg (36,400 lb)	LEO	SpaceX	Success	Success (JRTI)
422	Launch of 21 Starlink v2 mini satellites, including 13 with direct-to-cell connectivity, to a 559 km (347 mi) orbit at an inclination of 43° to expand internet constellation. First booster to fly 25th time, new record.								
423	January 13, 2025; 16:47	F9 B5; B1080‑15	Cape Canaveral, SLC‑40	Starlink: Group 12-4 (21 satellites)	~16,500 kg (36,400 lb)	LEO	SpaceX	Success	Success (ASOG)
423	Launch of 21 Starlink v2 mini satellites, including 13 with direct-to-cell connectivity, to a 559 km (347 mi) orbit at an inclination of 43° to expand internet constellation.								
424	January 14, 2025; 19:09	F9 B5; B1088‑2	Vandenberg, SLC‑4E	Transporter-12 (131 payload smallsat rideshare)	2,000 kg (4,400 lb)	SSO	Various	Success	Success (LZ‑4)
424	Dedicated SmallSat Rideshare mission to sun-synchronous orbit.								
425	January 15, 2025; 06:11	F9 B5; B1085‑5	Kennedy, LC‑39A	Blue Ghost Mission 1	2,517 kg (5,549 lb)	TLI	Firefly Aerospace & NASA (CLPS)	Success	Success (JRTI)
425	January 15, 2025; 06:11	F9 B5; B1085‑5	Kennedy, LC‑39A	Hakuto-R Mission 2	2,517 kg (5,549 lb)	TLI	ispace	Success	Success (JRTI)
425	Both Blue Ghost Mission 1 and Hakuto-R Mission 2 (Resilience lander) launched together on a single rocket (first of its kind deep space lander launch). Blue Ghost will carry 10 payloads for NASA's Commercial Lunar Payload Services task order 19D mission and other separately contracted payloads. Resilience is the second lunar lander built by Japanese company ispace and will deliver TENACIOUS mini rover to the lunar surface. To house both landers in the payload fairing, SpaceX used a new dual-launch carrying structure. The upper stage impacted the Moon on August 5, 2026.								
426	January 21, 2025; 05:24	F9 B5; B1083‑8	Kennedy, LC‑39A	Starlink: Group 13-1 (21 satellites) + 2 Starshield satellites	~15,300 kg (33,700 lb) (Starlink)	LEO	SpaceX	Success	Success (ASOG)
426	Launch of 21 Starlink v2 mini satellites to a 559 km (347 mi) orbit at an inclination of 43° to expand internet constellation and two SpaceX Starshield satellites as rideshare. 1st time flying a fairing half for the 24th time.								
427	January 21, 2025; 15:45	F9 B5; B1082‑10	Vandenberg, SLC‑4E	Starlink: Group 11-8 (27 satellites)	~15,500 kg (34,200 lb)	LEO	SpaceX	Success	Success (OCISLY)
427	Launch of 27 Starlink v2 mini optimized satellites to a 535 km (332 mi) orbit at an inclination of 53° to expand internet constellation. Mission marks 400th Falcon booster landing.								
428	January 24, 2025; 14:07	F9 B5; B1063‑23	Vandenberg, SLC‑4E	Starlink: Group 11-6 (23 satellites)	~17,100 kg (37,700 lb)	LEO	SpaceX	Success	Success (OCISLY)
428	Launch of 23 Starlink v2 mini satellites to a 535 km (332 mi) orbit at an inclination of 53° to expand internet constellation. With this launch, SpaceX has broken its pad turnaround time record at Space Launch Complex 4 East. Previous record was 3 days, 15 hours, 23 minutes, and 40 seconds, this has now gone down to 2 days, 22 hours, 21 minutes, and 10 seconds.								
429	January 27, 2025; 22:05	F9 B5; B1076‑20	Cape Canaveral, SLC‑40	Starlink: Group 12-7 (21 satellites)	~16,500 kg (36,400 lb)	LEO	SpaceX	Success	Success (ASOG)
429	Launch of 21 Starlink v2 mini satellites, including 13 with direct-to-cell connectivity, to a 559 km (347 mi) orbit at an inclination of 43° to expand internet constellation.								
430	January 30, 2025; 01:34	F9 B5; B1073‑21	Kennedy, LC‑39A	Spainsat NG I	6,100 kg (13,400 lb)	GTO	Hisdesat	Success	No attempt
430	Communications satellite built on the Eurostar-Neo platform for the Spanish government. First of two launches for the Spainsat NG program. The booster was expended due to the performance needed to launch the satellite's mass to a geostationary transfer orbit.								
431	February 1, 2025; 23:02	F9 B5; B1075‑17	Vandenberg, SLC-4E	Starlink: Group 11-4	~16,700 kg (36,800 lb)	LEO	SpaceX	Success	Success (OCISLY)
431	Launch of 22 Starlink v2 mini satellites to a 535 km (332 mi) orbit at an inclination of 53° to expand internet constellation. Even though the second stage was expected to deorbit for a controlled splashdown, the second stage's deorbit burn did not occur, causing it to remain in orbit. This was the third time in six months that a second stage had encountered a problem in flight. The stage made its uncontrolled reentry over Poland between 04:46 and 04:48, local time, on February 19. Several tanks that crashed in the western part of the country were collected by the Polish police.								
432	February 4, 2025; 10:15	F9 B5; B1069‑21	Cape Canaveral, SLC‑40	Starlink: Group 12-3 (21 satellites)	~16,500 kg (36,400 lb)	LEO	SpaceX	Success	Success (JRTI)
432	Launch of 21 Starlink v2 mini satellites, including 13 with direct-to-cell connectivity, to a 559 km (347 mi) orbit at an inclination of 43° to expand internet constellation. 1st time flying a fairing half for the 25th time.								
433	February 4, 2025; 23:13	F9 B5; B1086‑4	Kennedy, LC‑39A	WorldView Legion 5 & 6 (2 satellites)	1,500 kg (3,300 lb)	LEO	Maxar Technologies	Success	Success (LZ‑1)
433	Two earth observation satellites built by Maxar Technologies. Seventh time a second stage featured Falcon medium coast mission-extension kit.								
434	February 8, 2025; 19:18	F9 B5; B1078‑17	Cape Canaveral, SLC‑40	Starlink: Group 12-9 (21 satellites)	~16,500 kg (36,400 lb)	LEO	SpaceX	Success	Success (ASOG)
434	Launch of 21 Starlink v2 mini satellites, including 13 with direct-to-cell connectivity, to a 559 km (347 mi) orbit at an inclination of 43° to expand internet constellation.								
435	February 11, 2025; 02:09	F9 B5; B1071‑23	Vandenberg, SLC-4E	Starlink: Group 11-10	~17,100 kg (37,700 lb)	LEO	SpaceX	Success	Success (OCISLY)
435	Launch of 23 Starlink v2 mini satellites to a 535 km (332 mi) orbit at an inclination of 53° to expand internet constellation.								
436	February 11, 2025; 18:53	F9 B5; B1077‑18	Cape Canaveral, SLC‑40	Starlink: Group 12-18 (21 satellites)	~16,500 kg (36,400 lb)	LEO	SpaceX	Success	Success (JRTI)
436	Launch of 21 Starlink v2 mini satellites, including 13 with direct-to-cell connectivity, to a 559 km (347 mi) orbit at an inclination of 43° to expand internet constellation.								
437	February 15, 2025; 06:14	F9 B5; B1067‑26	Cape Canaveral, SLC‑40	Starlink: Group 12-8	~16,500 kg (36,400 lb)	LEO	SpaceX	Success	Success (ASOG)
437	Launch of 21 Starlink v2 mini satellites, including 13 with direct-to-cell connectivity, to a 559 km (347 mi) orbit at an inclination of 43° to expand internet constellation. First booster to fly and be recovered 26th time, new record. 1st time flying a fairing half for the 26th time. Both surpassed Space Shuttle Endeavour's tally of 25 reflights, now only trailing behind Space Shuttle Atlantis and Space Shuttle Discovery.								
438	February 18, 2025; 23:21	F9 B5; B1080‑16	Cape Canaveral, SLC‑40	Starlink: Group 10-12 (23 satellites)	~17,100 kg (37,700 lb)	LEO	SpaceX	Success	Success (JRTI)
438	Launch of 23 Starlink v2 mini satellites to a 559 km (347 mi) orbit at an inclination of 43° to expand internet constellation. First booster landing in waters belonging to another nation (Exuma Sound) as part of an agreement with The Bahamas.								
439	February 21, 2025; 15:19	F9 B5; B1076‑21	Cape Canaveral, SLC‑40	Starlink: Group 12-14 (23 satellites)	~17,100 kg (37,700 lb)	LEO	SpaceX	Success	Success (ASOG)
439	Launch of 23 Starlink v2 mini satellites, including 13 with direct-to-cell connectivity, to a 559 km (347 mi) orbit at an inclination of 43° to expand internet constellation.								
440	February 23, 2025; 01:38	F9 B5; B1082‑11	Vandenberg, SLC‑4E	Starlink: Group 15-1 (22 satellites)	~16,800 kg (37,000 lb)	LEO	SpaceX	Success	Success (OCISLY)
440	Launch of 22 Starlink v2 mini satellites to a 70° inclination orbit to expand internet constellation.								
441	February 27, 2025; 00:16	F9 B5; B1083‑9	Kennedy, LC‑39A	IM-2 Nova-C "Athena" lunar lander Lunar Trailblazer; Brokkr-2 Odin; Chimera-1; TBD	Unknown	TLI	NASA (CLPS); Intuitive Machines; AstroForge; Epic Aerospace; TBD	Success	Success (ASOG)
441	IM-2 South Pole Mission, flying the second Nova-C lunar lander. The Polar Resources Ice Mining Experiment 1 (PRIME-1) payload will be delivered to the lunar south pole near Shackleton Crater for the CLPS program. Odin will travel to near Earth asteroid 2022 OB_{5}. Two Geostationary satellites are undisclosed. 100th booster landing on ASOG.								
442	February 27, 2025; 03:34	F9 B5; B1092‑1	Cape Canaveral, SLC‑40	Starlink: Group 12-13 (21 satellites)	~16,500 kg (36,400 lb)	LEO	SpaceX	Success	Success (JRTI)
442	Launch of 21 Starlink v2 mini satellites, including 13 with direct-to-cell connectivity, to a 559 km (347 mi) orbit at an inclination of 43° to expand internet constellation. Initially, there was some uncertainty on whether booster B1092 was used or a different booster was used, as according to SpaceX it was the booster's first flight, but was confirmed in the coming days. 1st time flying a fairing half for the 27th time.								
443	March 3, 2025; 02:24	F9 B5; B1086‑5	Cape Canaveral, SLC‑40	Starlink: Group 12-20 (21 satellites)	~16,500 kg (36,400 lb)	LEO	SpaceX	Success	Failure (JRTI)
443	Launch of 21 Starlink v2 mini satellites, including 13 with direct-to-cell connectivity, to a 559 km (347 mi) orbit at an inclination of 43° to expand internet constellation. A fuel leak started in one of the nine Merlin engines in the first stage 85 seconds after liftoff. However, because of the altitude of the rocket, there was no oxygen to ignite the fuel, allowing the first stage to completed its ascent without issue. However, 45 seconds after the booster landed, enough oxygen had entered the engine compartment where the leak occurred, creating a large fire. The fire resulted in the structural failure of one of the landing legs, leading to the booster tipping over and being destroyed. SpaceX voluntarily paused launches for more than a week as it investigated the issue.								
444	March 12, 2025; 03:10	F9 B5; B1088‑3	Vandenberg, SLC‑4E	SPHEREx; PUNCH	758 kg (1,671 lb)	SSO	NASA	Success	Success (LZ‑4)
444	SPHEREx is a NASA space observatory that will measure the near-infrared spectra of galaxies. PUNCH is a constellation of four microsatellites to study the Sun's corona and heliosphere, launched as a rideshare.								
445	March 13, 2025; 02:35	F9 B5; B1069‑22	Cape Canaveral, SLC‑40	Starlink: Group 12-21	~16,500 kg (36,400 lb)	LEO	SpaceX	Success	Success (ASOG)
445	Launch of 21 Starlink v2 mini satellites, including 13 with direct-to-cell connectivity, to a 559 km (347 mi) orbit at an inclination of 43° to expand internet constellation.								
446	March 14, 2025; 23:03	F9 B5; B1090‑2	Kennedy, LC‑39A	Crew-10 (Crew Dragon C210-4 Endurance)	~13,000 kg (29,000 lb)	LEO (ISS)	NASA (CCP)	Success	Success (LZ‑1)
446	Ferried four Expedition 72 / 73 crew members to the ISS for a long-duration mission.								
447	March 15, 2025; 06:43	F9 B5; B1081‑13	Vandenberg, SLC‑4E	Transporter-13 (74 payload smallsat rideshare)	Unknown (Note: Many Transporter and Bandwagon payloads are not public, or don't have a publicly revealed mass. SpaceX has not published a payload mass estimate for this mission.)	SSO	Various	Success	Success (LZ‑4)
447	Dedicated SmallSat rideshare mission to sun-synchronous orbit.								
448	March 15, 2025; 11:35	F9 B5; B1078‑18	Cape Canaveral, SLC‑40	Starlink: Group 12-16	~17,100 kg (37,700 lb)	LEO	SpaceX	Success	Success (JRTI)
448	Launch of 23 Starlink v2 mini satellites, including 13 with direct-to-cell connectivity, to a 559 km (347 mi) orbit at an inclination of 43° to expand internet constellation.								
449	March 18, 2025; 19:57	F9 B5; B1077‑19	Cape Canaveral, SLC‑40	Starlink: Group 12-25	~17,100 kg (37,700 lb)	LEO	SpaceX	Success	Success (ASOG)
449	Launch of 23 Starlink v2 mini satellites, including 13 with direct-to-cell connectivity, to a 559 km (347 mi) orbit at an inclination of 43° to expand internet constellation. 1st time flying a fairing half for the 28th time.								
450	March 21, 2025; 06:49	F9 B5; B1088‑4	Vandenberg, SLC‑4E	NROL-57 (~11 Starshield satellites)	Unknown	LEO	NRO	Success	Success (LZ‑4)
450	Eighth launch of SpaceX/Northrop Grumman-built satellites for the National Reconnaissance Office. Based on the number of gaps in the catalog it appears that this launch only deployed 11 payloads, likely indicating a larger Starshield version. This mission marks the shortest turnaround time for any Falcon booster at 9 days, 3 hours, 39 minutes and 28 seconds.								
451	March 24, 2025; 17:48	F9 B5; B1092‑2	Cape Canaveral, SLC‑40	NROL-69	Unknown	LEO	USSF	Success	Success (LZ‑1)
451	Presumed to be an Intruder-class signals intelligence satellite.								
452	March 26, 2025; 22:11	F9 B5; B1063‑24	Vandenberg, SLC‑4E	Starlink: Group 11-7	~15,500 kg (34,200 lb)	LEO	SpaceX	Success	Success (OCISLY)
452	Launch of 27 Starlink v2 mini optimized satellites to a 535 km (332 mi) orbit at an inclination of 53° to expand internet constellation.								
453	March 31, 2025; 19:52	F9 B5; B1080‑17	Cape Canaveral, SLC‑40	Starlink: Group 6-80	~16,100 kg (35,500 lb)	LEO	SpaceX	Success	Success (JRTI)
453	Launch of 28 Starlink v2 mini optimized satellites to a 559 km (347 mi) orbit at an inclination of 43° to expand internet constellation.								
454	April 1, 2025; 01:46	F9 B5; B1085‑6	Kennedy, LC‑39A	Fram2 (Crew Dragon C207-4 Resilience)	~13,000 kg (29,000 lb)	Polar (Retrograde)	Chun Wang	Success	Success (ASOG)
454	First ever crewed mission launched into polar orbit.								
455	April 4, 2025; 01:02	F9 B5; B1088‑5	Vandenberg, SLC‑4E	Starlink: Group 11-13	~15,500 kg (34,200 lb)	LEO	SpaceX	Success	Success (OCISLY)
455	Launch of 27 Starlink v2 mini optimized satellites to a 535 km (332 mi) orbit at an inclination of 53° to expand internet constellation.								
456	April 6, 2025; 03:07	F9 B5; B1078‑19	Cape Canaveral, SLC‑40	Starlink: Group 6-72	~16,100 kg (35,500 lb)	LEO	SpaceX	Success	Success (JRTI)
456	Launch of 28 Starlink v2 mini optimized satellites to a 559 km (347 mi) orbit at an inclination of 43° to expand internet constellation.								
457	April 7, 2025; 23:06	F9 B5; B1093‑1	Vandenberg, SLC‑4E	Starlink: Group 11-11	~15,500 kg (34,200 lb)	LEO	SpaceX	Success	Success (OCISLY)
457	Launch of 27 Starlink v2 mini satellites, to a 535 km (332 mi) orbit at an inclination of 53° to expand internet constellation.								
458	April 12, 2025; 12:25	F9 B5; B1071‑24	Vandenberg, SLC‑4E	NROL-192 (22 Starshield satellites)	Unknown	LEO	NRO	Success	Success (OCISLY)
458	Ninth launch of SpaceX/Northrop Grumman-built satellites for the National Reconnaissance Office.								
459	April 13, 2025; 00:53	F9 B5; B1083‑10	Kennedy, LC‑39A	Starlink: Group 12-17	~16,500 kg (36,400 lb)	LEO	SpaceX	Success	Success (ASOG)
459	Launch of 21 Starlink v2 mini satellites, including 13 with direct-to-cell connectivity, to a 559 km (347 mi) orbit at an inclination of 43° to expand internet constellation.								
460	April 14, 2025; 04:00	F9 B5; B1067‑27	Cape Canaveral, SLC‑40	Starlink: Group 6-73	~15,500 kg (34,200 lb)	LEO	SpaceX	Success	Success (JRTI)
460	Launch of 27 Starlink v2 mini optimized satellites to a 559 km (347 mi) orbit at an inclination of 43° to expand internet constellation. First booster to fly and be recovered 27th time, new record.								
461	April 20, 2025; 12:29	F9 B5; B1082‑12	Vandenberg, SLC‑4E	NROL-145 (22 Starshield satellites)	Unknown	LEO	NRO	Success	Success (OCISLY)
461	Tenth launch of SpaceX/Northrop Grumman-built Starshield satellites for the National Reconnaissance Office. First NRO Proliferated Architecture Mission launch in partnership with USSF under the NSSL Phase 3 Lane 1 contract.								
462	April 21, 2025; 08:15	F9 B5; B1092‑3	Kennedy, LC‑39A	SpaceX CRS-32 (Cargo Dragon C209-5)	3,021 kg (6,660 lb)	LEO (ISS)	NASA (CRS)	Success	Success (LZ‑1)
462	Carried cargo and supplies to the International Space Station (ISS).								
463	April 22, 2025; 00:48	F9 B5; B1090‑3	Cape Canaveral, SLC‑40	Bandwagon-3 (425Sat-3, Tomorrow-S7, PHOENIX)	Unknown	LEO	Republic of Korea Armed Forces; Tomorrow.io; Atmos Space Cargo	Success	Success (LZ‑2)
463	SmallSat rideshare mission to a 550–600 km (340–370 mi) orbit at an inclination of 45°. Launch featured a rare Falcon 9 landing at LZ-2, as the booster from the CRS-32 launch just hours before was still on LZ-1. 425Sat-3 is the third synthetic-aperture radar satellite for the constellation and the fourth flight of Korea 425 Project for the South Korean military. Also on the flight are Tomorrow.io's Tomorrow-S7 satellite and Atmos Space Cargo's PHOENIX re-entry capsule. This mission marks the 300th launch from SLC-40.								
464	April 25, 2025; 01:52	F9 B5; B1069‑23	Cape Canaveral, SLC‑40	Starlink: Group 6-74	~16,100 kg (35,500 lb)	LEO	SpaceX	Success	Success (ASOG)
464	Launch of 28 Starlink v2 mini optimized satellites to a 559 km (347 mi) orbit at an inclination of 43° to expand internet constellation. 1st time flying a fairing half for the 29th time.								
465	April 28, 2025; 02:09	F9 B5; B1077‑20	Cape Canaveral, SLC‑40	Starlink: Group 12-23	~17,100 kg (37,700 lb)	LEO	SpaceX	Success	Success (JRTI)
465	Launch of 23 Starlink v2 mini satellites, including 13 with direct-to-cell connectivity, to a 559 km (347 mi) orbit at an inclination of 43° to expand internet constellation. 250th dedicated Starlink constellation launch.								
466	April 28, 2025; 20:42	F9 B5; B1063‑25	Vandenberg, SLC‑4E	Starlink: Group 11-9	~15,500 kg (34,200 lb)	LEO	SpaceX	Success	Success (OCISLY)
466	Launch of 27 Starlink v2 mini optimized satellites to a 535 km (332 mi) orbit at an inclination of 53° to expand internet constellation.								
467	April 29, 2025; 02:34	F9 B5; B1094‑1	Kennedy, LC‑39A	Starlink: Group 12-10	~17,100 kg (37,700 lb)	LEO	SpaceX	Success	Success (ASOG)
467	Launch of 23 Starlink v2 mini satellites, including 13 with direct-to-cell connectivity, to a 559 km (347 mi) orbit at an inclination of 43° to expand internet constellation.								
468	May 2, 2025; 01:51	F9 B5; B1080‑18	Cape Canaveral, SLC‑40	Starlink: Group 6-75	~16,100 kg (35,500 lb)	LEO	SpaceX	Success	Success (JRTI)
468	Launch of 28 Starlink v2 mini optimized satellites to a 559 km (347 mi) orbit at an inclination of 43° to expand internet constellation.								
469	May 4, 2025; 08:54	F9 B5; B1078‑20	Kennedy, LC‑39A	Starlink: Group 6-84	~16,675 kg (36,762 lb)	LEO	SpaceX	Success	Success (ASOG)
469	Launch of 29 Starlink v2 mini optimized satellites to a 559 km (347 mi) orbit at an inclination of 43° to expand internet constellation. Fastest launch turnaround at Pad 39A.								
470	May 7, 2025; 01:17	F9 B5; B1085‑7	Cape Canaveral, SLC‑40	Starlink: Group 6-93	~16,100 kg (35,500 lb)	LEO	SpaceX	Success	Success (JRTI)
470	Launch of 28 Starlink v2 mini optimized satellites to a 559 km (347 mi) orbit at an inclination of 43° to expand internet constellation. 470th Falcon 9 rocket launch.								
471	May 10, 2025; 00:19	F9 B5; B1081‑14	Vandenberg, SLC‑4E	Starlink: Group 15-3	~14,950 kg (32,960 lb)	LEO	SpaceX	Success	Success (OCISLY)
471	Launch of 26 Starlink v2 mini optimized satellites to a 535 km (332 mi) orbit at an inclination of 70° to expand internet constellation.								
472	May 10, 2025; 06:28	F9 B5; B1083‑11	Cape Canaveral, SLC‑40	Starlink: Group 6-91	~16,100 kg (35,500 lb)	LEO	SpaceX	Success	Success (ASOG)
472	Launch of 28 Starlink v2 mini optimized satellites to a 559 km (347 mi) orbit at an inclination of 43° to expand internet constellation. The active fairing half flew for record 30th time as per launch webcasts.								
473	May 13, 2025; 01:15	F9 B5; B1088‑6	Vandenberg, SLC‑4E	Starlink: Group 15-4	~14,950 kg (32,960 lb)	LEO	SpaceX	Success	Success (OCISLY)
473	Launch of 26 Starlink v2 mini optimized satellites to a 535 km (332 mi) orbit at an inclination of 70° to expand internet constellation.								
474	May 13, 2025; 05:02	F9 B5; B1067‑28	Kennedy, LC‑39A	Starlink: Group 6-83	~16,100 kg (35,500 lb)	LEO	SpaceX	Success	Success (JRTI)
474	Launch of 28 Starlink v2 mini optimized satellites to a 559 km (347 mi) orbit at an inclination of 43° to expand internet constellation. First booster to launch and land for the 28th time. 100th single-stick Falcon 9 to launch from LC-39A.								
475	May 14, 2025; 16:38	F9 B5; B1090‑4	Cape Canaveral, SLC‑40	Starlink: Group 6-67	~16,100 kg (35,500 lb)	LEO	SpaceX	Success	Success (ASOG)
475	Launch of 28 Starlink v2 mini optimized satellites to a 559 km (347 mi) orbit at an inclination of 43° to expand internet constellation.								
476	May 16, 2025; 13:43	F9 B5; B1093‑2	Vandenberg, SLC‑4E	Starlink: Group 15-5	~14,950 kg (32,960 lb)	LEO	SpaceX	Success	Success (OCISLY)
476	Launch of 26 Starlink v2 mini optimized satellites to a 535 km (332 mi) orbit at an inclination of 70° to expand internet constellation.								
477	May 21, 2025; 03:19	F9 B5; B1095‑1	Cape Canaveral, SLC‑40	Starlink: Group 12-15	~17,100 kg (37,700 lb)	LEO	SpaceX	Success	Success (JRTI)
477	Launch of 23 Starlink v2 mini satellites, including 13 with direct-to-cell connectivity, to a 559 km (347 mi) orbit at an inclination of 43° to expand internet constellation.								
478	May 23, 2025; 22:32	F9 B5; B1075‑18	Vandenberg, SLC‑4E	Starlink: Group 11-16	~15,500 kg (34,200 lb)	LEO	SpaceX	Success	Success (OCISLY)
478	Launch of 27 Starlink v2 mini optimized satellites to a 535 km (332 mi) orbit at an inclination of 53° to expand internet constellation. 450th Falcon booster landing.								
479	May 24, 2025; 17:19	F9 B5; B1069‑24	Cape Canaveral, SLC‑40	Starlink: Group 12-22	~17,100 kg (37,700 lb)	LEO	SpaceX	Success	Success (ASOG)
479	Launch of 23 Starlink v2 mini satellites, including 13 with direct-to-cell connectivity, to a 559 km (347 mi) orbit at an inclination of 43° to expand internet constellation.								
480	May 27, 2025; 16:57	F9 B5; B1082‑13	Vandenberg, SLC‑4E	Starlink: Group 17-1	~17,500 kg (38,600 lb)	SSO	SpaceX	Success	Success (OCISLY)
480	Launch of 24 Starlink v2 mini satellites to a 560 km (350 mi) orbit at an inclination of 98° to expand internet constellation. First Starlink launch with SSO inclination in over 2 years.								
481	May 28, 2025; 13:30	F9 B5; B1080‑19	Kennedy, LC‑39A	Starlink: Group 10-32	~15,500 kg (34,200 lb)	LEO	SpaceX	Success	Success (JRTI)
481	Launch of 27 Starlink v2 mini optimized satellites to a 279 km (173 mi) orbit at an inclination of 53° to expand internet constellation. The active fairing half flew for record 31st time as per launch webcasts.								
482	May 30, 2025; 17:37	F9 B5; B1092‑4	Cape Canaveral, SLC‑40	GPS III-8	4,350 kg (9,590 lb)	MEO	USSF	Success	Success (ASOG)
482	GPS III-8, originally scheduled to launch on a ULA Vulcan rocket, was reassigned to the Falcon 9. As a result, GPS IIIF-1, originally planned to launch on the Falcon Heavy, will now launch on Vulcan.								
483	May 31, 2025; 20:10	F9 B5; B1071‑25	Vandenberg, SLC‑4E	Starlink: Group 11-18	~15,500 kg (34,200 lb)	LEO	SpaceX	Success	Success (OCISLY)
483	Launch of 27 Starlink v2 mini optimized satellites to a 535 km (332 mi) orbit at an inclination of 53° to expand internet constellation.								
484	June 3, 2025; 04:43	F9 B5; B1077‑21	Cape Canaveral, SLC‑40	Starlink: Group 12-19	~17,100 kg (37,700 lb)	LEO	SpaceX	Success	Success (JRTI)
484	Launch of 23 Starlink v2 mini satellites, including 13 with direct-to-cell connectivity, to a 559 km (347 mi) orbit at an inclination of 43° to expand internet constellation. 500th launch of SpaceX's Falcon launch vehicles.								
485	June 4, 2025; 23:40	F9 B5; B1063‑26	Vandenberg, SLC‑4E	Starlink: Group 11-22	~15,500 kg (34,200 lb)	LEO	SpaceX	Success	Success (OCISLY)
485	Launch of 27 Starlink v2 mini optimized satellites to a 535 km (332 mi) orbit at an inclination of 53° to expand internet constellation. 500th Falcon Family Orbital Launch.								
486	June 7, 2025; 04:54	F9 B5; B1085‑8	Cape Canaveral, SLC‑40	SXM-10	6,400 kg (14,100 lb)	GTO	SiriusXM	Success	Success (ASOG)
486	SXM-10 is a high-powered, digital, audio radio satellite built by Maxar (SSL) for SiriusXM. SpaceX successfully completed a controlled deorbit of the SiriusXM-10 upper stage after GTO payload deployment, a first of its kind.								
487	June 8, 2025; 14:20	F9 B5; B1088‑7	Vandenberg, SLC‑4E	Starlink: Group 15-8	~14,950 kg (32,960 lb)	LEO	SpaceX	Success	Success (OCISLY)
487	Launch of 26 Starlink v2 mini optimized satellites to a 535 km (332 mi) orbit at an inclination of 70° to expand internet constellation.								
488	June 10, 2025; 13:05	F9 B5; B1083‑12	Cape Canaveral, SLC‑40	Starlink: Group 12-24	~17,100 kg (37,700 lb)	LEO	SpaceX	Success	Success (JRTI)
488	Launch of 23 Starlink v2 mini satellites, including 13 with direct-to-cell connectivity, to a 559 km (347 mi) orbit at an inclination of 43° to expand internet constellation.								
489	June 13, 2025; 01:54	F9 B5; B1081‑15	Vandenberg, SLC‑4E	Starlink: Group 15-6	~14,950 kg (32,960 lb)	LEO	SpaceX	Success	Success (OCISLY)
489	Launch of 26 Starlink v2 mini optimized satellites to a 535 km (332 mi) orbit at an inclination of 70° to expand internet constellation. 500th Falcon 9 mission.								
490	June 13, 2025; 15:29	F9 B5; B1078‑21	Cape Canaveral, SLC‑40	Starlink: Group 12-26	~17,100 kg (37,700 lb)	LEO	SpaceX	Success	Success (ASOG)
490	Launch of 23 Starlink v2 mini satellites, including 13 with direct-to-cell connectivity, to a 559 km (347 mi) orbit at an inclination of 43° to expand internet constellation.								
491	June 17, 2025; 03:36	F9 B5; B1093‑3	Vandenberg, SLC‑4E	Starlink: Group 15-9	~14,950 kg (32,960 lb)	LEO	SpaceX	Success	Success (OCISLY)
491	Launch of 26 Starlink v2 mini optimized satellites to a 535 km (332 mi) orbit at an inclination of 70° to expand internet constellation.								
492	June 18, 2025; 05:55	F9 B5; B1090‑5	Cape Canaveral, SLC‑40	Starlink: Group 10-18	~16,100 kg (35,500 lb)	LEO	SpaceX	Success	Success (JRTI)
492	Launch of 28 Starlink v2 mini optimized satellites to a 279 km (173 mi) orbit at an inclination of 53° to expand internet constellation.								
493	June 23, 2025; 05:58	F9 B5; B1069‑25	Cape Canaveral, SLC‑40	Starlink: Group 10-23	~15,500 kg (34,200 lb)	LEO	SpaceX	Success	Success (ASOG)
493	Launch of 27 Starlink v2 mini optimized satellites to a 279 km (173 mi) orbit at an inclination of 53° to expand internet constellation.								
494	June 23, 2025; 21:25	F9 B5; B1071‑26	Vandenberg, SLC‑4E	Transporter-14 (70 payloads smallsat rideshare)	Unknown	SSO	Various	Success	Success (OCISLY)
494	Dedicated SmallSat rideshare mission to sun-synchronous orbit.								
495	June 25, 2025; 06:31	F9 B5; B1094‑2	Kennedy, LC‑39A	Axiom Mission 4 (Crew Dragon C213-1 Grace)	~13,000 kg (29,000 lb)	LEO (ISS)	Axiom Space	Success	Success (LZ‑1)
495	Fully private flight to the ISS. The crew consisted of Axiom Commander Peggy Whitson, Pilot Shubhanshu Shukla of the ISRO and mission specialists Sławosz Uznański-Wiśniewski of ESA/POLSA and Tibor Kapu of Hungary.								
496	June 25, 2025; 19:54	F9 B5; B1080‑20	Cape Canaveral, SLC‑40	Starlink: Group 10-16	~15,500 kg (34,200 lb)	LEO	SpaceX	Success	Success (JRTI)
496	Launch of 27 Starlink v2 mini optimized satellites to a 279 km (173 mi) orbit at an inclination of 53° to expand internet constellation. The active fairing half flew for record 32th time as per launch webcasts.								
497	June 28, 2025; 04:26	F9 B5; B1092‑5	Cape Canaveral, SLC‑40	Starlink: Group 10-34	~15,500 kg (34,200 lb)	LEO	SpaceX	Success	Success (ASOG)
497	Launch of 27 Starlink v2 mini optimized satellites to a 279 km (173 mi) orbit at an inclination of 53° to expand internet constellation. 1st time flying a fairing half for the 32nd time.								
498	June 28, 2025; 17:13	F9 B5; B1088‑8	Vandenberg, SLC‑4E	Starlink: Group 15-7	~14,950 kg (32,960 lb)	LEO	SpaceX	Success	Success (OCISLY)
498	Launch of 26 Starlink v2 mini optimized satellites to a 535 km (332 mi) orbit at an inclination of 70° to expand internet constellation. Fastest turnaround between two launches from a single pad (56 hours, 31 minutes and 10sec apart), three launches from a single pad (118 hours 27 minutes 30 seconds) and for barge from preceding landed booster arrival onshore to next launch (5 days).								
499	July 1, 2025; 21:04	F9 B5; B1085‑9	Kennedy, LC‑39A	MTG-S1 / Sentinel-4A	3,800 kg (8,400 lb)	GTO	EUMETSAT	Success	Success (JRTI)
499	Geostationary weather satellite. Launch vehicle changed from Ariane 6 to Falcon 9.								
500	July 2, 2025; 06:28	F9 B5; B1067‑29	Cape Canaveral, SLC‑40	Starlink: Group 10-25	~15,500 kg (34,200 lb)	LEO	SpaceX	Success	Success (ASOG)
500	Launch of 27 Starlink v2 mini optimized satellites to a 279 km (173 mi) orbit at an inclination of 53° to expand internet constellation. 500th launch of Falcon 9. First booster to fly 29th time, new record.								
501	July 8, 2025; 08:21	F9 B5; B1077‑22	Cape Canaveral, SLC‑40	Starlink: Group 10-28	~16,100 kg (35,500 lb)	LEO	SpaceX	Success	Success (ASOG)
501	Launch of 28 Starlink v2 mini optimized satellites to a 279 km (173 mi) orbit at an inclination of 53° to expand internet constellation. 500th orbital launch of Falcon 9.								
502	July 13, 2025; 05:04	F9 B5; B1083‑13	Cape Canaveral, SLC‑40	Dror-1	4,000 kg (8,800 lb)	GTO	IAI	Success	Success (JRTI)
502	Launch of the Dror 1 geostationary communication satellite built and developed by Israel Aerospace Industries (IAI). 500th successful launch of Falcon 9.								
503	July 16, 2025; 02:05	F9 B5; B1093‑4	Vandenberg, SLC‑4E	Starlink: Group 15-2	~14,950 kg (32,960 lb)	LEO	SpaceX	Success	Success (OCISLY)
503	Launch of 26 Starlink v2 mini optimized satellites to a 295 km (183 mi) orbit at an inclination of 70° to expand internet constellation.								
504	July 16, 2025; 06:30	F9 B5; B1096‑1	Cape Canaveral, SLC‑40	KuiperSat × 24 (KF-01)	~14,784 kg (32,593 lb)	LEO	Amazon (Kuiper Systems)	Success	Success (ASOG)
504	First of three Falcon 9 launches in support of Amazon's Project Kuiper internet constellation. First Kuiper launch on a rocket other than Atlas V.								
505	July 19, 2025; 03:52	F9 B5; B1082‑14	Vandenberg, SLC‑4E	Starlink: Group 17-3	~17,500 kg (38,600 lb)	SSO	SpaceX	Success	Success (OCISLY)
505	Launch of 24 Starlink v2 mini satellites to a 560 km (350 mi) orbit at an inclination of 97° to expand internet constellation.								
506	July 22, 2025; 21:12	F9 B5; B1090‑6	Cape Canaveral, SLC‑40	O3b mPOWER 9 & 10	3,400 kg (7,500 lb)	MEO	SES	Success	Success (JRTI)
506	Launch of two O3b mPOWER satellites, a system operated by SES that delivers high-throughput, low-latency global broadband from medium Earth orbit using dynamic beam shaping.								
507	July 23, 2025; 18:13	F9 B5; B1081‑16	Vandenberg, SLC‑4E	TRACERS (2 satellites) + 5 rideshares	~920 kg (2,030 lb)	SSO	NASA	Success	Success (LZ‑4)
507	Tandem Reconnection and Cusp Electrodynamics Reconnaissance Satellites (TRACERS) is a Small Explorers program mission. Additional scientific SmallSat missions will rideshare: PExT Demo (Polylingual Experimental Terminal), Athena EPIC (Economical Payload Integration Cost), REAL (Realistic Electron Atmospheric Loss), 5 × Skykraft 4 space-based air traffic management satellites and LIDE (Direct Access Live Demonstration).								
508	July 26, 2025; 09:01	F9 B5; B1078‑22	Cape Canaveral, SLC‑40	Starlink: Group 10-26	~16,100 kg (35,500 lb)	LEO	SpaceX	Success	Success (ASOG)
508	Launch of 28 Starlink v2 mini optimized satellites to a 279 km (173 mi) orbit at an inclination of 53° to expand internet constellation.								
509	July 27, 2025; 04:31	F9 B5; B1075‑19	Vandenberg, SLC‑4E	Starlink: Group 17-2	~17,500 kg (38,600 lb)	SSO	SpaceX	Success	Success (OCISLY)
509	Launch of 24 Starlink v2 mini satellites to a 560 km (350 mi) orbit at an inclination of 97° to expand internet constellation.								
510	July 30, 2025; 03:37	F9 B5; B1069‑26	Cape Canaveral, SLC‑40	Starlink: Group 10-29	~16,100 kg (35,500 lb)	LEO	SpaceX	Success	Success (JRTI)
510	Launch of 28 Starlink v2 mini optimized satellites to a 279 km (173 mi) orbit at an inclination of 53° to expand internet constellation.								
511	July 31, 2025; 18:35	F9 B5; B1071‑27	Vandenberg, SLC‑4E	Starlink: Group 13-4 + 2 Starshield satellites	~14,060 kg (31,000 lb) (Starlink)	SSO	SpaceX	Success	Success (OCISLY)
511	Launch of 19 Starlink v2 mini satellites to a 325 km (202 mi) orbit at an inclination of 97° to expand internet constellation. Two Starshield onboard this starlink group, and there were no views of second stage during launch.								
512	August 1, 2025; 15:43	F9 B5; B1094‑3	Kennedy, LC‑39A	Crew-11 (Crew Dragon C206-6 Endeavour)	~13,000 kg (29,000 lb)	LEO (ISS)	NASA (CCP)	Success	Success (LZ‑1)
512	Long-duration mission. Will ferry four Expedition 73 / 74 crew members to the ISS. Endeavour is the first Dragon to fly beyond the initial certification of 5 flights per Dragon. During a press conference before Crew-11, Gerstenmaier said the landing of B1094 will be the final use of Landing Zone 1, but they will continue to use Landing Zone 2. That site, Launch Complex 13, is being transitioned back to a launch pad to be jointly used by Phantom Space Corporation and Vaya Space, while SpaceX will make new landing pads within the vicinity of LC‑39A and SLC‑40. Fastest Crew Dragon rendezvous to date.								
513	August 4, 2025; 07:57	F9 B5; B1080‑21	Cape Canaveral, SLC‑40	Starlink: Group 10-30	~16,100 kg (35,500 lb)	LEO	SpaceX	Success	Success (JRTI)
513	Launch of 28 Starlink v2 mini optimized satellites to a 279 km (173 mi) orbit at an inclination of 53° to expand internet constellation.								
514	August 11, 2025; 12:35	F9 B5; B1091‑1	Cape Canaveral, SLC‑40	KuiperSat × 24 (KF-02)	~14,784 kg (32,593 lb)	LEO	Amazon (Kuiper Systems)	Success	Success (ASOG)
514	Second of three Falcon 9 launches in support of Amazon's Project Kuiper internet constellation. First Falcon Heavy core type booster to fly a Falcon 9 mission.								
515	August 14, 2025; 05:05	F9 B5; B1093‑5	Vandenberg, SLC‑4E	Starlink: Group 17-4	~17,500 kg (38,600 lb)	SSO	SpaceX	Success	Success (OCISLY)
515	Launch of 24 Starlink v2 mini satellites to a 560 km (350 mi) orbit at an inclination of 98° to expand internet constellation.								
516	August 14, 2025; 12:29	F9 B5; B1085‑10	Cape Canaveral, SLC‑40	Starlink: Group 10-20	~16,100 kg (35,500 lb)	LEO	SpaceX	Success	Success (JRTI)
516	Launch of 28 Starlink v2 mini optimized satellites to a 279 km (173 mi) orbit at an inclination of 53° to expand internet constellation. Starlink tested a “mini laser” to allow connectivity for third party satellites and space stations with the Starlink constellation.								
517	August 18, 2025; 16:26	F9 B5; B1088‑9	Vandenberg, SLC‑4E	Starlink: Group 17-5	~17,500 kg (38,600 lb)	SSO	SpaceX	Success	Success (OCISLY)
517	Launch of 24 Starlink v2 mini satellites to a 560 km (350 mi) orbit at an inclination of 98° to expand internet constellation. 100th Falcon 9 launch this year.								
518	August 22, 2025; 03:50	F9 B5; B1092‑6	Kennedy, LC‑39A	USSF-36 (Boeing X-37B OTV-8)	~4,990 kg (11,000 lb)	LEO	USSF	Success	Success (LZ‑2)
518	Launch part of Phase 2 US Space Force contract awarded in 2021.								
519	August 22, 2025; 17:04	F9 B5; B1081‑17	Vandenberg, SLC‑4E	Starlink: Group 17-6	~17,500 kg (38,600 lb)	SSO	SpaceX	Success	Success (OCISLY)
519	Launch of 24 Starlink v2 mini satellites to a 281 km (175 mi) orbit at an inclination of 97° to expand internet constellation.								
520	August 24, 2025; 06:45	F9 B5; B1090‑7	Cape Canaveral, SLC‑40	SpaceX CRS-33 (Dragon C211-3)	2,300 kg (5,100 lb)	LEO (ISS)	NASA (CRS)	Success	Success (ASOG)
520	Commercial Resupply Services mission to the ISS. For the first time, this mission flew with a "boost trunk" with extra propellant and engines to perform re-boosts of the ISS over a period of several months.								
521	August 26, 2025; 18:53	F9 B5; B1063‑27	Vandenberg, SLC‑4E	NAOS + 7 rideshares	~1,370 kg (3,020 lb)	SSO	Luxembourg Armed Forces & others	Success	Success (LZ‑4)
521	National Advanced Optical System (NAOS) is a military reconnaissance satellite for the Luxembourg Armed Forces. Additional rideshare payloads on this mission: LEAP-1, Pelican-3 & 4, Acadia-6 and FFLY-1, 2 & 3.								
522	August 27, 2025; 11:10	F9 B5; B1095‑2	Cape Canaveral, SLC‑40	Starlink: Group 10-56	~16,100 kg (35,500 lb)	LEO	SpaceX	Success	Success (JRTI)
522	Launch of 28 Starlink v2 mini optimized satellites to a 279 km (173 mi) orbit at an inclination of 53° to expand internet constellation. 400th droneship landing.								
523	August 28, 2025; 08:12	F9 B5; B1067‑30	Kennedy, LC‑39A	Starlink: Group 10-11	~16,100 kg (35,500 lb)	LEO	SpaceX	Success	Success (ASOG)
523	Launch of 28 Starlink v2 mini optimized satellites to a 279 km (173 mi) orbit at an inclination of 53° to expand internet constellation. First booster to fly 30 missions.								
524	August 30, 2025; 04:59	F9 B5; B1082‑15	Vandenberg, SLC‑4E	Starlink: Group 17-7	~17,500 kg (38,600 lb)	SSO	SpaceX	Success	Success (OCISLY)
524	Launch of 24 Starlink v2 mini satellites to a 281 km (175 mi) orbit at an inclination of 97° to expand internet constellation.								
525	August 31, 2025; 11:49	F9 B5; B1077‑23	Cape Canaveral, SLC‑40	Starlink: Group 10-14	~16,100 kg (35,500 lb)	LEO	SpaceX	Success	Success (JRTI)
525	Launch of 28 Starlink v2 mini optimized satellites to a 279 km (173 mi) orbit at an inclination of 53° to expand internet constellation.								
526	September 3, 2025; 03:51	F9 B5; B1097‑1	Vandenberg, SLC‑4E	Starlink: Group 17-8	~17,500 kg (38,600 lb)	SSO	SpaceX	Success	Success (OCISLY)
526	Launch of 24 Starlink v2 mini satellites to a 281 km (175 mi) orbit at an inclination of 97° to expand internet constellation.								
527	September 3, 2025; 11:56	F9 B5; B1083‑14	Cape Canaveral, SLC‑40	Starlink: Group 10-22	~16,100 kg (35,500 lb)	LEO	SpaceX	Success	Success (ASOG)
527	Launch of 28 Starlink v2 mini optimized satellites to a 279 km (173 mi) orbit at an inclination of 53° to expand internet constellation. 1st time flying a fairing half for the 33rd time.								
528	September 5, 2025; 12:32	F9 B5; B1069‑27	Kennedy, LC‑39A	Starlink: Group 10-57	~16,100 kg (35,500 lb)	LEO	SpaceX	Success	Success (JRTI)
528	Launch of 28 Starlink v2 mini optimized satellites to a 279 km (173 mi) orbit at an inclination of 53° to expand internet constellation. 500th landing of a Falcon booster.								
529	September 6, 2025; 18:06	F9 B5; B1075‑20	Vandenberg, SLC‑4E	Starlink: Group 17-9	~17,500 kg (38,600 lb)	SSO	SpaceX	Success	Success (OCISLY)
529	Launch of 24 Starlink v2 mini satellites to a 281 km (175 mi) orbit at an inclination of 97° to expand internet constellation. 2000th Starlink satellite launched this year. 300th dedicated Starlink launch. 150th successful landing on SpaceX's droneship, Of Course I Still Love You.								
530	September 10, 2025; 14:12	F9 B5; B1093‑6	Vandenberg, SLC‑4E	SDA Tranche 1 Transport Layer B (21 satellites)	Unknown	Polar LEO	SDA	Success	Success (OCISLY)
530	Launch part of Phase 2 US Space Force contract awarded in 2022.								
531	September 12, 2025; 01:56	F9 B5; B1078‑23	Cape Canaveral, SLC‑40	Nusantara Lima	~7,800 kg (17,200 lb)	GTO	PT Pasifik Satelit Nusantara	Success	Success (ASOG)
531	A hot backup system for SATRIA-1.								
532	September 13, 2025; 17:55	F9 B5; B1071‑28	Vandenberg, SLC‑4E	Starlink: Group 17-10	~17,500 kg (38,600 lb)	SSO	SpaceX	Success	Success (OCISLY)
532	Launch of 24 Starlink v2 mini satellites to a 281 km (175 mi) orbit at an inclination of 97° to expand internet constellation.								
533	September 14, 2025; 22:11	F9 B5; B1094‑4	Cape Canaveral, SLC‑40	CRS NG-23 (S.S. William "Willie" C. McCool)	5,000 kg (11,000 lb)	LEO (ISS)	Northrop Grumman (CRS)	Success	Success (LZ‑2)
533	ISS cargo resupply mission for Northrop Grumman's Cygnus spacecraft. The originally planned Cygnus NG-22 spacecraft was damaged during shipment to Cape Canaveral, delaying the launch. First flight of extended Cygnus XL spacecraft. Third of four missions scheduled to fly on a Falcon 9 rocket.								
534	September 18, 2025; 09:30	F9 B5; B1092‑7	Cape Canaveral, SLC‑40	Starlink: Group 10-61	~16,100 kg (35,500 lb)	LEO	SpaceX	Success	Success (JRTI)
534	Launch of 28 Starlink v2 mini optimized satellites to a 279 km (173 mi) orbit at an inclination of 53° to expand internet constellation.								
535	September 19, 2025; 16:31	F9 B5; B1088‑10	Vandenberg, SLC‑4E	Starlink: Group 17-12	~17,500 kg (38,600 lb)	SSO	SpaceX	Success	Success (OCISLY)
535	Launch of 24 Starlink v2 mini satellites to a 281 km (175 mi) orbit at an inclination of 97° to expand internet constellation.								
536	September 21, 2025; 10:53	F9 B5; B1085‑11	Cape Canaveral, SLC‑40	Starlink: Group 10-27	~16,100 kg (35,500 lb)	LEO	SpaceX	Success	Success (ASOG)
536	Launch of 28 Starlink v2 mini optimized satellites to a 279 km (173 mi) orbit at an inclination of 53° to expand internet constellation. Longest turnaround of a reusable component, achieved by the fairing half SN173 (1,568 days), last flown on the SXM-8 mission on June 6, 2021, breaking the previous record of F9 B5 B1053 (1,406 days).								
537	September 22, 2025; 17:38	F9 B5; B1081‑18	Vandenberg, SLC‑4E	NROL-48 (8 Starshield satellites)	Unknown	LEO	NRO	Success	Success (LZ‑4)
537	Eleventh launch of SpaceX/Northrop Grumman-built Starshield satellites for the National Reconnaissance Office.								
538	September 24, 2025; 11:30	F9 B5; B1096‑2	Kennedy, LC‑39A	Interstellar Mapping and Acceleration Probe (IMAP)	1,477 kg (3,256 lb)	Sun–Earth L_{1}	NASA	Success	Success (JRTI)
538	In September 2020, NASA selected SpaceX to launch the IMAP mission, which will help researchers better understand the boundary of the heliosphere, a magnetic barrier surrounding our solar system. The total launch cost is approximately US$109.4 million. The secondary payloads include the Carruthers Geocorona Observatory and the National Oceanic and Atmospheric Administration's Space Weather Follow On-Lagrange 1 (SWFO-L1) mission.								
539	September 25, 2025; 08:39	F9 B5; B1080‑22	Cape Canaveral, SLC‑40	Starlink: Group 10-15	~16,100 kg (35,500 lb)	LEO	SpaceX	Success	Success (ASOG)
539	Launch of 28 Starlink v2 mini optimized satellites to a 279 km (173 mi) orbit at an inclination of 53° to expand internet constellation.								
540	September 26, 2025; 04:26	F9 B5; B1082‑16	Vandenberg, SLC‑4E	Starlink: Group 17-11	~17,500 kg (38,600 lb)	SSO	SpaceX	Success	Success (OCISLY)
540	Launch of 24 Starlink v2 mini satellites to a 281 km (175 mi) orbit at an inclination of 97° to expand internet constellation.								
541	September 29, 2025; 02:04	F9 B5; B1063‑28	Vandenberg, SLC‑4E	Starlink: Group 11-20	~16,100 kg (35,500 lb)	LEO	SpaceX	Success	Success (OCISLY)
541	Launch of 28 Starlink v2 mini optimized satellites to a 295 km (183 mi) orbit at an inclination of 53° to expand internet constellation. First time SpaceX conducted 8 West Coast launches in a single calendar month.								
542	October 3, 2025; 14:06	F9 B5; B1097‑2	Vandenberg, SLC‑4E	Starlink: Group 11-39	~16,100 kg (35,500 lb)	LEO	SpaceX	Success	Success (OCISLY)
542	Launch of 28 Starlink v2 mini optimized satellites to a 295 km (183 mi) orbit at an inclination of 53° to expand internet constellation. 47 launches were carried out in this complex this year, surpassing last year with 46 launches carried out.								
543	October 7, 2025; 06:46	F9 B5; B1090‑8	Cape Canaveral, SLC‑40	Starlink: Group 10-59	~16,100 kg (35,500 lb)	LEO	SpaceX	Success	Success (ASOG)
543	Launch of 28 Starlink v2 mini optimized satellites to a 279 km (173 mi) orbit at an inclination of 53° to expand internet constellation. 90th Starlink mission of 2025.								
544	October 8, 2025; 03:54	F9 B5; B1071‑29	Vandenberg, SLC‑4E	Starlink: Group 11-17	~16,100 kg (35,500 lb)	LEO	SpaceX	Success	Success (OCISLY)
544	Launch of 28 Starlink v2 mini optimized satellites to a 295 km (183 mi) orbit at an inclination of 53° to expand internet constellation.								
545	October 14, 2025; 01:58	F9 B5; B1091‑2	Cape Canaveral, SLC‑40	KuiperSat × 24 (KF-03)	~14,784 kg (32,593 lb)	LEO	Amazon (Kuiper Systems)	Success	Success (ASOG)
545	Third of three Falcon 9 launches in support of Amazon's Project Kuiper internet constellation. Final Kuiper launch prior to its renaming to Amazon Leo.								
546	October 15, 2025; 23:06	F9 B5; B1093‑7	Vandenberg, SLC‑4E	SDA Tranche 1 Transport Layer C (21 satellites)	Unknown	Polar LEO	SDA	Success	Success (OCISLY)
546	Launch part of Phase 2 US Space Force contract awarded in 2022.								
547	October 16, 2025; 09:27	F9 B5; B1095‑3	Cape Canaveral, SLC‑40	Starlink: Group 10-52	~16,100 kg (35,500 lb)	LEO	SpaceX	Success	Success (JRTI)
547	Launch of 28 Starlink v2 mini optimized satellites to a 279 km (173 mi) orbit at an inclination of 53° to expand internet constellation. 500th landing of a Falcon first stage booster. Fastest launch to launch from the same American Launch Pad at 55 hours, 29 minutes and 9 seconds. Fastest Transporter Erector roll-in to hangar for booster integration to launch at 12 hours, 5 minutes, 20 seconds. 1st time flying a fairing half for the 34th time.								
548	October 19, 2025; 17:39	F9 B5; B1067‑31	Cape Canaveral, SLC‑40	Starlink: Group 10-17	~16,100 kg (35,500 lb)	LEO	SpaceX	Success	Success (ASOG)
548	Launch of 28 Starlink v2 mini optimized satellites to a 279 km (173 mi) orbit at an inclination of 53° to expand internet constellation. First booster to fly 31 missions.								
549	October 19, 2025; 19:24	F9 B5; B1088‑11	Vandenberg, SLC‑4E	Starlink: Group 11-19	~16,100 kg (35,500 lb)	LEO	SpaceX	Success	Success (OCISLY)
549	Launch of 28 Starlink v2 mini optimized satellites to a 295 km (183 mi) orbit at an inclination of 53° to expand internet constellation. Launched 10,000th Starlink satellite.								
550	October 22, 2025; 14:16	F9 B5; B1075‑21	Vandenberg, SLC‑4E	Starlink: Group 11-5	~16,100 kg (35,500 lb)	LEO	SpaceX	Success	Success (OCISLY)
550	Launch of 28 Starlink v2 mini optimized satellites to a 295 km (183 mi) orbit at an inclination of 53° to expand internet constellation.								
551	October 24, 2025; 01:30	F9 B5; B1076‑22	Cape Canaveral, SLC‑40	Spainsat NG II	6,100 kg (13,400 lb)	GTO	Hisdesat	Success	No attempt
551	Communications satellite built on the Eurostar-Neo platform, to be used by the Spanish government and its allies. Second of two launches for the Spainsat-NG program. First stage booster was expended due to the performance needed to lift the 6,100 kg (13,400 lb) satellite to GTO.								
552	October 25, 2025; 14:20	F9 B5; B1081‑19	Vandenberg, SLC‑4E	Starlink: Group 11-12	~16,100 kg (35,500 lb)	LEO	SpaceX	Success	Success (OCISLY)
552	Launch of 28 Starlink v2 mini optimized satellites to a 295 km (183 mi) orbit at an inclination of 53° to expand internet constellation.								
553	October 26, 2025; 15:00	F9 B5; B1077‑24	Cape Canaveral, SLC‑40	Starlink: Group 10-21	~16,100 kg (35,500 lb)	LEO	SpaceX	Success	Success (ASOG)
553	Launch of 28 Starlink v2 mini optimized satellites to a 279 km (173 mi) orbit at an inclination of 53° to expand internet constellation.								
554	October 28, 2025; 00:43	F9 B5; B1082‑17	Vandenberg, SLC‑4E	Starlink: Group 11-21	~16,100 kg (35,500 lb)	LEO	SpaceX	Success	Success (OCISLY)
554	Launch of 28 Starlink v2 mini optimized satellites to a 295 km (183 mi) orbit at an inclination of 53° to expand internet constellation. Fastest turnaround between two consecutive launches for SLC-4E, with 2 days and 10 hours between launches. The droneship made it to the landing position roughly 15 seconds before the start of propellant loading.								
555	October 29, 2025; 16:35	F9 B5; B1083‑15	Cape Canaveral, SLC‑40	Starlink: Group 10-37	~16,675 kg (36,762 lb)	LEO	SpaceX	Success	Success (JRTI)
555	Launch of 29 Starlink v2 mini optimized satellites to a 279 km (173 mi) orbit at an inclination of 53° to expand internet constellation. First time launch of 29 optimized Starlink v2 mini.								
556	October 31, 2025; 20:41	F9 B5; B1063‑29	Vandenberg, SLC‑4E	Starlink: Group 11-23	~16,100 kg (35,500 lb)	LEO	SpaceX	Success	Success (OCISLY)
556	Launch of 28 Starlink v2 mini optimized satellites to a 295 km (183 mi) orbit at an inclination of 53° to expand internet constellation. 100th Starlink Mission in 2025. 500th Falcon 9 Block 5 launch.								
557	November 2, 2025; 05:09	F9 B5; B1091‑3	Cape Canaveral, SLC‑40	Bandwagon-4 (18 payloads smallsat rideshare)	Unknown	LEO	Various	Success	Success (LZ‑2)
557	Dedicated SmallSat Rideshare mission to 45 degree inclination 550–600 km altitude.								
558	November 6, 2025; 01:31	F9 B5; B1094‑5	Cape Canaveral, SLC‑40	Starlink: Group 6-81	~16,675 kg (36,762 lb)	LEO	SpaceX	Success	Success (JRTI)
558	Launch of 29 Starlink v2 mini optimized satellites to a 559 km (347 mi) orbit at an inclination of 43° to expand internet constellation. 500th successful Falcon 9 Block 5 Orbital launch.								
559	November 6, 2025; 21:13	F9 B5; B1093‑8	Vandenberg, SLC‑4E	Starlink: Group 11-14	~16,100 kg (35,500 lb)	LEO	SpaceX	Success	Success (OCISLY)
559	Launch of 28 Starlink v2 mini optimized satellites to a 295 km (183 mi) orbit at an inclination of 53° to expand internet constellation.								
560	November 9, 2025; 08:10	F9 B5; B1069‑28	Kennedy, LC‑39A	Starlink: Group 10-51	~16,675 kg (36,762 lb)	LEO	SpaceX	Success	Success (ASOG)
560	Launch of 29 Starlink v2 mini optimized satellites to a 279 km (173 mi) orbit at an inclination of 53° to expand internet constellation.								
561	November 11, 2025; 03:21	F9 B5; B1096‑3	Cape Canaveral, SLC‑40	Starlink: Group 6-87	~16,675 kg (36,762 lb)	LEO	SpaceX	Success	Success (JRTI)
561	Launch of 29 Starlink v2 mini optimized satellites to a 559 km (347 mi) orbit at an inclination of 43° to expand internet constellation.								
562	November 15, 2025; 03:08	F9 B5; B1092‑8	Kennedy, LC‑39A	Starlink: Group 6-89	~16,675 kg (36,762 lb)	LEO	SpaceX	Success	Success (ASOG)
562	Launch of 29 Starlink v2 mini optimized satellites to a 559 km (347 mi) orbit at an inclination of 43° to expand internet constellation.								
563	November 15, 2025; 06:44	F9 B5; B1078‑24	Cape Canaveral, SLC‑40	Starlink: Group 6-85	~16,675 kg (36,762 lb)	LEO	SpaceX	Success	Success (JRTI)
563	Launch of 29 Starlink v2 mini optimized satellites to a 559 km (347 mi) orbit at an inclination of 43° to expand internet constellation.								
564	November 17, 2025; 05:21	F9 B5; B1097‑3	Vandenberg, SLC‑4E	Sentinel-6B	1,440 kg (3,170 lb)	LEO	NASA / NOAA / EUMETSAT / ESA	Success	Success (LZ‑4)
564	Identical to Sentinel-6A. 500th overall reflight of a flight-proven Falcon family booster.								
565	November 19, 2025; 00:12	F9 B5; B1085‑12	Cape Canaveral, SLC‑40	Starlink: Group 6-94	~16,675 kg (36,762 lb)	LEO	SpaceX	Success	Success (ASOG)
565	Launch of 29 Starlink v2 mini optimized satellites to a 559 km (347 mi) orbit at an inclination of 43° to expand internet constellation.								
566	November 21, 2025; 03:39	F9 B5; B1080‑23	Kennedy, LC‑39A	Starlink: Group 6-78	~16,675 kg (36,762 lb)	LEO	SpaceX	Success	Success (JRTI)
566	Launch of 29 Starlink v2 mini optimized satellites to a 559 km (347 mi) orbit at an inclination of 43° to expand internet constellation. 1st time flying a fairing half for the 35th time.								
567	November 22, 2025; 07:53	F9 B5; B1090‑9	Cape Canaveral, SLC‑40	Starlink: Group 6-79	~16,675 kg (36,762 lb)	LEO	SpaceX	Success	Success (ASOG)
567	Launch of 29 Starlink v2 mini optimized satellites to a 559 km (347 mi) orbit at an inclination of 43° to expand internet constellation. 150th Falcon 9 launch of the year.								
568	November 23, 2025; 08:48	F9 B5; B1100‑1	Vandenberg, SLC‑4E	Starlink: Group 11-30	~16,100 kg (35,500 lb)	LEO	SpaceX	Success	Success (OCISLY)
568	Launch of 28 Starlink v2 mini optimized satellites to a 295 km (183 mi) orbit at an inclination of 53° to expand internet constellation.								
569	November 28, 2025; 18:44	F9 B5; B1071‑30	Vandenberg, SLC‑4E	Transporter-15 (140 payloads smallsat rideshare)	Unknown	SSO	Various	Success	Success (OCISLY)
569	Dedicated SmallSat rideshare mission to sun-synchronous orbit. Includes ESA's HydroGNSS mission. Payload likely heavier than most rideshares due to barge landing of first stage. First time, a booster completed launching 1000 cumulative satellites to space.								
570	December 1, 2025; 07:44	F9 B5; B1095‑4	Kennedy, LC‑39A	Starlink: Group 6-86	~16,675 kg (36,762 lb)	LEO	SpaceX	Success	Success (JRTI)
570	Launch of 29 Starlink v2 mini optimized satellites to a 559 km (347 mi) orbit at an inclination of 43° to expand internet constellation.								
571	December 2, 2025; 05:28	F9 B5; B1081‑20	Vandenberg, SLC‑4E	Starlink: Group 15-10	~15,525 kg (34,227 lb)	LEO	SpaceX	Success	Success (OCISLY)
571	Launch of 27 Starlink v2 mini optimized satellites to a 295 km (183 mi) orbit at an inclination of 70° to expand internet constellation.								
572	December 2, 2025; 22:18	F9 B5; B1077‑25	Cape Canaveral, SLC‑40	Starlink: Group 6-95	~16,675 kg (36,762 lb)	LEO	SpaceX	Success	Success (ASOG)
572	Launch of 29 Starlink v2 mini optimized satellites to a 559 km (347 mi) orbit at an inclination of 43° to expand internet constellation.								
573	December 4, 2025; 20:42	F9 B5; B1097‑4	Vandenberg, SLC‑4E	Starlink: Group 11-25	~16,100 kg (35,500 lb)	LEO	SpaceX	Success	Success (OCISLY)
573	Launch of 28 Starlink v2 mini optimized satellites to a 295 km (183 mi) orbit at an inclination of 53° to expand internet constellation.								
574	December 7, 2025; 17:58	F9 B5; B1088‑12	Vandenberg, SLC‑4E	Starlink: Group 11-15	~16,100 kg (35,500 lb)	LEO	SpaceX	Success	Success (OCISLY)
574	Launch of 28 Starlink v2 mini optimized satellites to a 295 km (183 mi) orbit at an inclination of 53° to expand internet constellation.								
575	December 8, 2025; 22:26	F9 B5; B1067‑32	Kennedy, LC‑39A	Starlink: Group 6-92	~16,675 kg (36,762 lb)	LEO	SpaceX	Success	Success (ASOG)
575	Launch of 29 Starlink v2 mini optimized satellites to a 559 km (347 mi) orbit at an inclination of 43° to expand internet constellation. First booster to fly 32 missions.								
576	December 9, 2025; 19:16	F9 B5; B1096‑4	Cape Canaveral, SLC‑40	NROL-77	Unknown	LEO	NRO	Success	Success (LZ‑2)
576	Launch is part of Phase 2 US Air Force contract awarded in 2022.								
577	December 10, 2025; 11:40	F9 B5; B1082‑18	Vandenberg, SLC‑4E	Starlink: Group 15-11	~15,525 kg (34,227 lb)	LEO	SpaceX	Success	Success (OCISLY)
577	Launch of 27 Starlink v2 mini optimized satellites to a 295 km (183 mi) orbit at an inclination of 70° to expand internet constellation.								
578	December 11, 2025; 22:01	F9 B5; B1083‑16	Cape Canaveral, SLC‑40	Starlink: Group 6-90	~16,675 kg (36,762 lb)	LEO	SpaceX	Success	Success (JRTI)
578	Launch of 29 Starlink v2 mini optimized satellites to a 559 km (347 mi) orbit at an inclination of 43° to expand internet constellation. Fastest turnaround at SLC-40 between two launches at 50 hours and 44 minutes.								
579	December 14, 2025; 05:49	F9 B5; B1093‑9	Vandenberg, SLC‑4E	Starlink: Group 15-12	~15,525 kg (34,227 lb)	LEO	SpaceX	Success	Success (OCISLY)
579	Launch of 27 Starlink v2 mini optimized satellites to a 295 km (183 mi) orbit at an inclination of 70° to expand internet constellation.								
580	December 15, 2025; 05:25	F9 B5; B1092‑9	Cape Canaveral, SLC‑40	Starlink: Group 6-82	~16,675 kg (36,762 lb)	LEO	SpaceX	Success	Success (ASOG)
580	Launch of 29 Starlink v2 mini optimized satellites to a 559 km (347 mi) orbit at an inclination of 43° to expand internet constellation.								
581	December 17, 2025; 13:42	F9 B5; B1094‑6	Kennedy, LC‑39A	Starlink: Group 6-99	~16,675 kg (36,762 lb)	LEO	SpaceX	Success	Success (JRTI)
581	Launch of 29 Starlink v2 mini optimized satellites to a 559 km (347 mi) orbit at an inclination of 43° to expand internet constellation. Last Falcon 9 launch from Kennedy Space Center LC-39A before the pad is prioritized for Falcon Heavy and Starship launches.								
582	December 17, 2025; 15:27	F9 B5; B1063‑30	Vandenberg, SLC‑4E	Starlink: Group 15-13	~15,525 kg (34,227 lb)	LEO	SpaceX	Success	Success (OCISLY)
582	Launch of 27 Starlink v2 mini optimized satellites to a 295 km (183 mi) orbit at an inclination of 70° to expand internet constellation. 1st time flying a fairing half for the 36th time.								

=== 2026 ===
As of November 22, SpaceX has conducted 125 Falcon family vehicle launches (122 Falcon 9 and 3 Falcon Heavy) in 2026. SpaceX President Gwynne Shotwell stated in Time magazine they are expecting "maybe 140, 145-ish" Falcon 9 launches in 2026.

Flight No.	Date and time (UTC)	Version, booster	Launch site	Payload	Payload mass	Orbit	Customer	Launch outcome	Booster landing
583	January 3, 2026; 02:09	F9 B5; B1081‑21	Vandenberg, SLC‑4E	CSG-3	2,230 kg (4,920 lb)	SSO	ASI	Success	Success (LZ‑4)
583	Third COSMO-SkyMed 2nd-generation satellite. 100th Falcon booster ground pad landing.								
584	January 4, 2026; 06:48	F9 B5; B1101‑1	Cape Canaveral, SLC‑40	Starlink: Group 6-88	~16,675 kg (36,762 lb)	LEO	SpaceX	Success	Success (JRTI)
584	Launch of 29 Starlink v2 mini optimized satellites to a 559 km (347 mi) orbit at an inclination of 43° to expand internet constellation.								
585	January 9, 2026; 21:41	F9 B5; B1069‑29	Cape Canaveral, SLC‑40	Starlink: Group 6-96	~16,675 kg (36,762 lb)	LEO	SpaceX	Success	Success (ASOG)
585	Launch of 29 Starlink v2 mini optimized satellites to a 559 km (347 mi) orbit at an inclination of 43° to expand internet constellation.								
586	January 11, 2026; 13:44	F9 B5; B1097‑5	Vandenberg, SLC‑4E	Twilight (Pandora and others 39 payloads)	325 kg (717 lb) (main satellite)	SSO	NASA & Various	Success	Success (LZ‑4)
586	Dedicated SmallSat rideshare mission to sun-synchronous orbit.								
587	January 12, 2026; 21:08	F9 B5; B1078‑25	Cape Canaveral, SLC‑40	Starlink: Group 6-97	~16,675 kg (36,762 lb)	LEO	SpaceX	Success	Success (JRTI)
587	Launch of 29 Starlink v2 mini optimized satellites to a 559 km (347 mi) orbit at an inclination of 43° to expand internet constellation.								
588	January 14, 2026; 18:08	F9 B5; B1085‑13	Cape Canaveral, SLC‑40	Starlink: Group 6-98	~16,675 kg (36,762 lb)	LEO	SpaceX	Success	Success (ASOG)
588	Launch of 29 Starlink v2 mini optimized satellites to a 559 km (347 mi) orbit at an inclination of 43° to expand internet constellation. A new pad turnaround time record, launching 45 hours and 0 minutes after the previous mission.								
589	January 17, 2026; 04:39	F9 B5; B1100‑2	Vandenberg, SLC‑4E	NROL-105 (9 Starshield satellites)	Unknown	LEO	NRO	Success	Success (LZ‑4)
589	Twelfth batch SpaceX/Northrop Grumman-built Starshield satellites for the National Reconnaissance Office.								
590	January 18, 2026; 23:31	F9 B5; B1080‑24	Cape Canaveral, SLC‑40	Starlink: Group 6-100	~16,675 kg (36,762 lb)	LEO	SpaceX	Success	Success (ASOG)
590	Launch of 29 Starlink v2 mini optimized satellites to a 559 km (347 mi) orbit at an inclination of 43° to expand internet constellation.								
591	January 22, 2026; 05:47	F9 B5; B1093‑10	Vandenberg, SLC‑4E	Starlink: Group 17-30	~14,375 kg (31,691 lb)	SSO	SpaceX	Success	Success (OCISLY)
591	Launch of 25 Starlink v2 mini satellites to a 281 km (175 mi) orbit at an inclination of 97° to expand internet constellation.								
592	January 25, 2026; 17:30	F9 B5; B1097‑6	Vandenberg, SLC‑4E	Starlink: Group 17-20	~14,375 kg (31,691 lb)	SSO	SpaceX	Success	Success (OCISLY)
592	Launch of 25 Starlink v2 mini satellites to a 281 km (175 mi) orbit at an inclination of 97° to expand internet constellation. Some Starship tiles were placed on the exterior of fairing for testing.								
593	January 28, 2026; 04:53	F9 B5; B1096‑5	Cape Canaveral, SLC‑40	GPS III-9	4,350 kg (9,590 lb)	MEO	USSF	Success	Success (ASOG)
593	Part of Phase 3 Lane 2 US Space Force contract awarded in 2025. The launch of GPS III-9 was originally scheduled for Vulcan, but was changed to F9, and therefore the USSF-15 (GPS IIIF-03) mission, that was planned for Falcon Heavy in 2027 will be carried out by Vulcan.								
594	January 29, 2026; 17:53	F9 B5; B1082‑19	Vandenberg, SLC‑4E	Starlink: Group 17-19	~14,375 kg (31,691 lb)	SSO	SpaceX	Success	Success (OCISLY)
594	Launch of 25 Starlink v2 mini satellites to a 281 km (175 mi) orbit at an inclination of 97° to expand internet constellation.								
595	January 30, 2026; 07:22	F9 B5; B1095‑5	Cape Canaveral, SLC‑40	Starlink: Group 6-101	~16,675 kg (36,762 lb)	LEO	SpaceX	Success	Success (JRTI)
595	Launch of 29 Starlink v2 mini optimized satellites to a 559 km (347 mi) orbit at an inclination of 43° to expand internet constellation.								
596	February 2, 2026; 15:47	F9 B5; B1071‑31	Vandenberg, SLC‑4E	Starlink: Group 17-32	~14,375 kg (31,691 lb)	SSO	SpaceX	Success	Success (OCISLY)
596	Launch of 25 Starlink v2 mini satellites to a 281 km (175 mi) orbit at an inclination of 97° to expand internet constellation. After payload delivery, the second stage did not conduct de-orbit burn but passivated as designed. Anomaly was attributed to a gas bubble in a transfer tube, arising from SpaceX testing "refined" pre-burn engine chill profiles for deorbit burns.								
597	February 7, 2026; 20:58	F9 B5; B1088‑13	Vandenberg, SLC‑4E	Starlink: Group 17-33	~14,375 kg (31,691 lb)	SSO	SpaceX	Success	Success (OCISLY)
597	Launch of 25 Starlink v2 mini satellites to a 281 km (175 mi) orbit at an inclination of 97° to expand internet constellation.								
598	February 11, 2026; 17:11	F9 B5; B1100‑3	Vandenberg, SLC‑4E	Starlink: Group 17-34	~13,800 kg (30,400 lb)	SSO	SpaceX	Success	Success (OCISLY)
598	Launch of 24 Starlink v2 mini satellites to a 281 km (175 mi) orbit at an inclination of 97° to expand internet constellation.								
599	February 13, 2026; 10:15	F9 B5; B1101‑2	Cape Canaveral, SLC‑40	Crew-12 (Crew Dragon C212-5 Freedom)	~13,000 kg (29,000 lb)	LEO (ISS)	NASA (CTS)	Success	Success (LZ‑40)
599	In June 2022, NASA announced it purchased an additional 5 crewed flights (Crew-10 through Crew-14) from SpaceX in addition to the previous 9 missions on top of the $3.5 billion contract. Landing Zone 40 (LZ-40) of the SLC-40 used for the first time. This landing zone was created last year to support Falcon 9 landings closer to the pad, similar to the SLC-4E which has its LZ-4 landing zone only 420 meters from the platform. This will facilitate the recovery process since LZ-1 and LZ-2, used by SpaceX since 2015, have been deactivated and will be replaced by launch pads from Vaya Space and Phantom Space.								
600	February 15, 2026; 01:59	F9 B5; B1081‑22	Vandenberg, SLC‑4E	Starlink: Group 17-13	~13,800 kg (30,400 lb)	SSO	SpaceX	Success	Success (OCISLY)
600	Launch of 24 Starlink v2 mini satellites to a 281 km (175 mi) orbit at an inclination of 97° to expand internet constellation.								
601	February 16, 2026; 07:59	F9 B5; B1090‑10	Cape Canaveral, SLC‑40	Starlink: Group 6-103	~16,675 kg (36,762 lb)	LEO	SpaceX	Success	Success (ASOG)
601	9Launch of 29 Starlink v2 mini optimized satellites to a 559 km (347 mi) orbit at an inclination of 43° to expand internet constellation.								
602	February 20, 2026; 01:41	F9 B5; B1077‑26	Cape Canaveral, SLC‑40	Starlink: Group 10-36	~16,675 kg (36,762 lb)	LEO	SpaceX	Success	Success (JRTI)
602	Launch of 29 Starlink v2 mini optimized satellites to a 279 km (173 mi) orbit at an inclination of 53° to expand internet constellation. Booster has landed within The Bahamas, first operational launch to do so after the trajectory was tested during launch of Starlink Group 10–12 in February 2025.								
603	February 21, 2026; 09:04	F9 B5; B1063‑31	Vandenberg, SLC‑4E	Starlink: Group 17-25	~14,375 kg (31,691 lb)	SSO	SpaceX	Success	Success (OCISLY)
603	Launch of 25 Starlink v2 mini satellites to a 281 km (175 mi) orbit at an inclination of 97° to expand internet constellation.								
604	February 22, 2026; 03:47	F9 B5; B1067‑33	Cape Canaveral, SLC‑40	Starlink: Group 6-104	~16,100 kg (35,500 lb)	LEO	SpaceX	Success	Success (ASOG)
604	Launch of 28 Starlink v2 mini optimized satellites to a 559 km (347 mi) orbit at an inclination of 43° to expand internet constellation. First booster to fly 33 missions, new record.								
605	February 24, 2026; 23:04	F9 B5; B1092‑10	Cape Canaveral, SLC‑40	Starlink: Group 6-110	~16,675 kg (36,762 lb)	LEO	SpaceX	Success	Success (JRTI)
605	Launch of 29 Starlink v2 mini optimized satellites to a 559 km (347 mi) orbit at an inclination of 43° to expand internet constellation.								
606	February 25, 2026; 14:17	F9 B5; B1093‑11	Vandenberg, SLC‑4E	Starlink: Group 17-26	~14,375 kg (31,691 lb)	SSO	SpaceX	Success	Success (OCISLY)
606	Launch of 25 Starlink v2 mini satellites to a 281 km (175 mi) orbit at an inclination of 97° to expand internet constellation.								
607	February 27, 2026; 12:16	F9 B5; B1069‑30	Cape Canaveral, SLC‑40	Starlink: Group 6-108	~16,675 kg (36,762 lb)	LEO	SpaceX	Success	Success (ASOG)
607	Launch of 29 Starlink v2 mini optimized satellites to a 559 km (347 mi) orbit at an inclination of 43° to expand internet constellation.								
608	March 1, 2026; 10:10	F9 B5; B1082‑20	Vandenberg, SLC‑4E	Starlink: Group 17-23	~14,375 kg (31,691 lb)	SSO	SpaceX	Success	Success (OCISLY)
608	Launch of 25 Starlink v2 mini satellites to a 281 km (175 mi) orbit at an inclination of 97° to expand internet constellation.								
609	March 2, 2026; 02:56	F9 B5; B1078‑26	Cape Canaveral, SLC‑40	Starlink: Group 10-41	~16,675 kg (36,762 lb)	LEO	SpaceX	Success	Success (JRTI)
609	Launch of 29 Starlink v2 mini optimized satellites to a 559 km (347 mi) orbit at an inclination of 43° to expand internet constellation.								
610	March 4, 2026; 10:52	F9 B5; B1080‑25	Cape Canaveral, SLC‑40	Starlink: Group 10-40	~16,675 kg (36,762 lb)	LEO	SpaceX	Success	Success (ASOG)
610	Launch of 29 Starlink v2 mini optimized satellites to a 559 km (347 mi) orbit at an inclination of 43° to expand internet constellation.								
611	March 8, 2026; 11:00	F9 B5; B1097‑7	Vandenberg, SLC‑4E	Starlink: Group 17-18	~14,375 kg (31,691 lb)	SSO	SpaceX	Success	Success (OCISLY)
611	Launch of 25 Starlink v2 mini satellites to a 281 km (175 mi) orbit at an inclination of 97° to expand internet constellation.								
612	March 10, 2026; 04:19	F9 B5; B1085‑14	Cape Canaveral, SLC‑40	EchoStar XXV	6,800 kg (15,000 lb)	GTO	EchoStar	Success	Success (ASOG)
612	EchoStar XXV is a direct broadcast satellite that will deliver content across North America. EchoStar XXV will be built on the proven Maxar 1300 series platform at the company's manufacturing facilities in Palo Alto and San Jose, California.								
613	March 13, 2026; 14:57	F9 B5; B1071‑32	Vandenberg, SLC‑4E	Starlink: Group 17-31	~14,375 kg (31,691 lb)	SSO	SpaceX	Success	Success (OCISLY)
613	Launch of 25 Starlink v2 mini satellites to a 281 km (175 mi) orbit at an inclination of 97° to expand internet constellation.								
614	March 14, 2026; 12:37	F9 B5; B1095‑6	Cape Canaveral, SLC‑40	Starlink: Group 10-48	~16,675 kg (36,762 lb)	LEO	SpaceX	Success	Success (JRTI)
614	Launch of 29 Starlink v2 mini optimized satellites to a 279 km (173 mi) orbit at an inclination of 53° to expand internet constellation.								
615	March 17, 2026; 05:19	F9 B5; B1088‑14	Vandenberg, SLC‑4E	Starlink: Group 17-24	~14,375 kg (31,691 lb)	SSO	SpaceX	Success	Success (OCISLY)
615	Launch of 25 Starlink v2 mini satellites to a 281 km (175 mi) orbit at an inclination of 97° to expand internet constellation.								
616	March 17, 2026; 13:27	F9 B5; B1090‑11	Cape Canaveral, SLC‑40	Starlink: Group 10-46	~16,675 kg (36,762 lb)	LEO	SpaceX	Success	Success (ASOG)
616	Launch of 29 Starlink v2 mini optimized satellites to a 279 km (173 mi) orbit at an inclination of 53° to expand internet constellation.								
617	March 19, 2026; 14:20	F9 B5; B1077‑27	Cape Canaveral, SLC‑40	Starlink: Group 10-33	~16,675 kg (36,762 lb)	LEO	SpaceX	Success	Success (JRTI)
617	Launch of 29 Starlink v2 mini optimized satellites to a 279 km (173 mi) orbit at an inclination of 53° to expand internet constellation.								
618	March 20, 2026; 21:51	F9 B5; B1100‑4	Vandenberg, SLC‑4E	Starlink: Group 17-15	~14,375 kg (31,691 lb)	SSO	SpaceX	Success	Success (OCISLY)
618	Launch of 25 Starlink v2 mini satellites to a 281 km (175 mi) orbit at an inclination of 97° to expand internet constellation.								
619	March 22, 2026; 14:47	F9 B5; B1078‑27	Cape Canaveral, SLC‑40	Starlink: Group 10-62	~16,675 kg (36,762 lb)	LEO	SpaceX	Success	Success (ASOG)
619	Launch of 29 Starlink v2 mini optimized satellites to a 279 km (173 mi) orbit at an inclination of 53° to expand internet constellation.								
620	March 26, 2026; 23:03	F9 B5; B1081‑23	Vandenberg, SLC‑4E	Starlink: Group 17-17	~14,375 kg (31,691 lb)	SSO	SpaceX	Success	Success (OCISLY)
620	Launch of 25 Starlink v2 mini satellites to a 281 km (175 mi) orbit at an inclination of 97° to expand internet constellation.								
621	March 30, 2026; 11:02	F9 B5; B1093‑12	Vandenberg, SLC‑4E	Transporter-16 (119 payloads smallsat rideshare)	Unknown	SSO	Various	Success	Success (OCISLY)
621	Dedicated SmallSat rideshare mission to sun-synchronous orbit.								
622	March 30, 2026; 21:15	F9 B5; B1067‑34	Cape Canaveral, SLC‑40	Starlink: Group 10-44	~16,675 kg (36,762 lb)	LEO	SpaceX	Success	Success (JRTI)
622	Launch of 29 Starlink v2 mini optimized satellites to a 279 km (173 mi) orbit at an inclination of 53° to expand internet constellation. First booster to fly 34 missions, new record.								
623	April 2, 2026; 11:55	F9 B5; B1085‑15	Cape Canaveral, SLC‑40	Starlink: Group 10-58	~16,675 kg (36,762 lb)	LEO	SpaceX	Success	Success (ASOG)
623	Launch of 29 Starlink v2 mini optimized satellites to a 279 km (173 mi) orbit at an inclination of 53° to expand internet constellation.								
624	April 7, 2026; 02:50	F9 B5; B1103‑1	Vandenberg, SLC‑4E	Starlink: Group 17-35	~14,375 kg (31,691 lb)	SSO	SpaceX	Success	Success (OCISLY)
624	Launch of 25 Starlink v2 mini satellites to a 281 km (175 mi) orbit at an inclination of 97° to expand internet constellation.								
625	April 11, 2026; 05:04	F9 B5; B1063‑32	Vandenberg, SLC‑4E	Starlink: Group 17-21	~14,375 kg (31,691 lb)	SSO	SpaceX	Success	Success (OCISLY)
625	Launch of 25 Starlink v2 mini satellites to a 281 km (175 mi) orbit at an inclination of 97° to expand internet constellation.								
626	April 11, 2026; 11:41	F9 B5; B1094‑7	Cape Canaveral, SLC‑40	Cygnus NG-24	5,000 kg (11,000 lb)	LEO (ISS)	Northrop Grumman (CRS)	Success	Success (LZ‑40)
626	Cygnus NG-24 cargo resupply to ISS under CRS.								
627	April 14, 2026; 09:33	F9 B5; B1080‑26	Cape Canaveral, SLC‑40	Starlink: Group 10-24	~16,675 kg (36,762 lb)	LEO	SpaceX	Success	Success (JRTI)
627	Launch of 29 Starlink v2 mini optimized satellites to a 279 km (173 mi) orbit at an inclination of 53° to expand internet constellation.								
628	April 15, 2026; 04:29	F9 B5; B1082‑21	Vandenberg, SLC‑4E	Starlink: Group 17-27	~14,375 kg (31,691 lb)	SSO	SpaceX	Success	Success (OCISLY)
628	Launch of 25 Starlink v2 mini satellites to a 281 km (175 mi) orbit at an inclination of 97° to expand internet constellation.								
629	April 19, 2026; 16:03	F9 B5; B1097‑8	Vandenberg, SLC‑4E	Starlink: Group 17-22	~14,375 kg (31,691 lb)	LEO	SpaceX	Success	Success (OCISLY)
629	Launch of 25 Starlink v2 mini satellites to a 281 km (175 mi) orbit at an inclination of 97° to expand internet constellation. 600th successful Falcon booster landing.								
630	April 21, 2026; 06:53	F9 B5; B1095‑7	Cape Canaveral, SLC‑40	GPS III-10	4,350 kg (9,590 lb)	MEO	USSF	Success	Success (JRTI)
630	Originally planned to launch on a Falcon 9, GPS III SV10 was shifted to Vulcan when GPS III SV07, intended to launch on Vulcan, was moved to the Falcon 9 in mid-2024 following Vulcan readiness concerns. Following the USSF-87 anomaly, GPS III SV10 was moved back to Falcon 9 and USSF-70 was moved to Vulcan. This mission was the final planned landing on Just Read The Instructions (JRTI), which will be dedicated to supporting Starship operations in the future.								
631	April 23, 2026; 03:23	F9 B5; B1100‑5	Vandenberg, SLC‑4E	Starlink: Group 17-14	~13,800 kg (30,400 lb)	SSO	SpaceX	Success	Success (OCISLY)
631	Launch of 24 Starlink v2 mini satellites to a 281 km (175 mi) orbit at an inclination of 97° to expand internet constellation.								
632	April 26, 2026; 14:37	F9 B5; B1088‑15	Vandenberg, SLC‑4E	Starlink: Group 17-16	~14,375 kg (31,691 lb)	SSO	SpaceX	Success	Success (OCISLY)
632	Launch of 25 Starlink v2 mini satellites to a 281 km (175 mi) orbit at an inclination of 97° to expand internet constellation.								
FH 12	April 29, 2026; 14:13	Falcon Heavy B5; B1098 (core)	Kennedy, LC‑39A	ViaSat-3 F3	6,400 kg (14,100 lb)	GTO	ViaSat	Success	No attempt
FH 12	April 29, 2026; 14:13	B1072‑2 (side)	Kennedy, LC‑39A	ViaSat-3 F3	6,400 kg (14,100 lb)	GTO	ViaSat	Success	Success (LZ‑40)
FH 12	April 29, 2026; 14:13	B1075‑22 (side)	Kennedy, LC‑39A	ViaSat-3 F3	6,400 kg (14,100 lb)	GTO	ViaSat	Success	Success (LZ‑2)
FH 12	Ka-band satellite for the APAC region. Originally planned to launch on a Ariane 6, payload was shifted to Falcon Heavy following Ariane development delays. B1075 had previously flown 21 Falcon 9 missions from Vandenberg before being converted into a side booster for this launch. It landed at LZ-40, becoming the first Falcon Heavy side booster to touch down at the pad. This mission was the eighth Falcon-family launch to use a second stage equipped with the medium mission-extension kit, required for a long coast phase between second-stage ignitions.								
633	April 30, 2026; 02:42	F9 B5; B1093‑13	Vandenberg, SLC‑4E	Starlink: Group 17-36	~13,800 kg (30,400 lb)	SSO	SpaceX	Success	Success (OCISLY)
633	Launch of 24 Starlink v2 mini satellites to a 281 km (175 mi) orbit at an inclination of 97° to expand internet constellation.								
634	May 1, 2026; 18:06	F9 B5; B1069‑31	Cape Canaveral, SLC‑40	Starlink: Group 10-38	~16,675 kg (36,762 lb)	LEO	SpaceX	Success	Success (ASOG)
634	Launch of 29 Starlink v2 mini optimized satellites to a 279 km (173 mi) orbit at an inclination of 53° to expand internet constellation.								
635	May 3, 2026; 07:00	F9 B5; B1071‑33	Vandenberg, SLC‑4E	CAS500-2; 45 Rideshares	500 kg (1,100 lb) CAS500-2	SSO	Korea Aerospace Industries & Others	Success	Success (LZ‑4)
635	South Korean Earth-observation satellite includes Rideshare Payloads.								
636	May 6, 2026; 03:59	F9 B5; B1081‑24	Vandenberg, SLC‑4E	Starlink: Group 17-29	~13,800 kg (30,400 lb)	SSO	SpaceX	Success	Success (OCISLY)
636	Launch of 24 Starlink v2 mini satellites to a 281 km (175 mi) orbit at an inclination of 97° to expand internet constellation. Debatably 268th consecutive successful booster landing, a record depending on whether booster landing for Starlink 12–20, launch 443 on March 3, 2026, is considered successful.								
637	May 12, 2026; 02:13	F9 B5; B1097‑9	Vandenberg, SLC‑4E	NROL-172 (22 Starshield satellites)	Unknown	LEO	NRO	Success	Success (OCISLY)
637	13th launch of batch SpaceX/Northrop Grumman-built Starshield satellites for the National Reconnaissance Office.								
638	May 15, 2026; 22:05	F9 B5; B1096‑6	Cape Canaveral, SLC‑40	SpaceX CRS-34 (Cargo Dragon C209-6)	2,948 kg (6,499 lb)	LEO (ISS)	NASA (CRS)	Success	Success (LZ‑40)
638	Carried 2,948 kg (6,499 lb) of cargo and supplies to the International Space Station (ISS).								
639	May 20, 2026; 02:46	F9 B5; B1103‑2	Vandenberg, SLC‑4E	Starlink: Group 17-42	~13,800 kg (30,400 lb)	SSO	SpaceX	Success	Success (OCISLY)
639	Launch of 24 Starlink v2 mini satellites to a 281 km (175 mi) orbit at an inclination of 97° to expand internet constellation.								
640	May 21, 2026; 10:04	F9 B5; B1077‑28	Cape Canaveral, SLC‑40	Starlink: Group 10-31	~16,675 kg (36,762 lb)	LEO	SpaceX	Success	Success (ASOG)
640	Launch of 29 Starlink v2 mini optimized satellites to a 279 km (173 mi) orbit at an inclination of 53° to expand internet constellation.								
641	May 25, 2026; 11:48	F9 B5; B1078‑28	Cape Canaveral, SLC‑40	Starlink: Group 10-47	~16,675 kg (36,762 lb)	LEO	SpaceX	Success	Success (ASOG)
641	Launch of 29 Starlink v2 mini optimized satellites to a 279 km (173 mi) orbit at an inclination of 53° to expand internet constellation.								
642	May 26, 2026; 14:50	F9 B5; B1100‑6	Vandenberg, SLC‑4E	Starlink: Group 17-37	~13,800 kg (30,400 lb)	SSO	SpaceX	Success	Success (OCISLY)
642	Launch of 24 Starlink v2 mini satellites to a 281 km (175 mi) orbit at an inclination of 97° to expand internet constellation.								
643	May 29, 2026; 12:57	F9 B5; B1085‑16	Cape Canaveral, SLC‑40	Starlink: Group 10-53	~16,675 kg (36,762 lb)	LEO	SpaceX	Success	Success (ASOG)
643	Launch of 29 Starlink v2 mini optimized satellites to a 279 km (173 mi) orbit at an inclination of 53° to expand internet constellation.								
644	May 30, 2026; 15:25	F9 B5; B1082‑22	Vandenberg, SLC‑4E	Starlink: Group 17-41	~13,800 kg (30,400 lb)	SSO	SpaceX	Success	Success (OCISLY)
644	Launch of 24 Starlink v2 mini satellites to a 281 km (175 mi) orbit at an inclination of 97° to expand internet constellation.								
645	June 3, 2026; 15:40	F9 B5; B1088‑16	Vandenberg, SLC‑4E	Starlink: Group 17-47	~13,800 kg (30,400 lb)	SSO	SpaceX	Success	Success (OCISLY)
645	Launch of 24 Starlink v2 mini satellites to a 281 km (175 mi) orbit at an inclination of 97° to expand internet constellation.								
646	June 4, 2026; 10:26	F9 B5; B1090‑12	Cape Canaveral, SLC‑40	Starlink: Group 10-43	~16,675 kg (36,762 lb)	LEO	SpaceX	Success	Success (ASOG)
646	Launch of 29 Starlink v2 mini optimized satellites to a 279 km (173 mi) orbit at an inclination of 53° to expand internet constellation, one of the first stage's grid fins locked up moments before touchdown however this did not affect the successful outcome of the landing.								
647	June 7, 2026; 04:24	F9 B5; B1097‑10	Vandenberg, SLC‑4E	Starlink: Group 17-43 + 2 Starshield satellites	~12,075 kg (26,621 lb)	SSO	SpaceX	Success	Success (OCISLY)
647	Launch of 21 Starlink v2 mini and 2 Starshield satellites to a 281 km (175 mi) orbit at an inclination of 97° to expand internet constellation. Includes Starshield satellites.								
648	June 8, 2026; 10:13	F9 B5; B1067‑35	Cape Canaveral, SLC‑40	Starlink: Group 10-35	~16,675 kg (36,762 lb)	LEO	SpaceX	Success	Success (ASOG)
648	Launch of 29 Starlink v2 mini optimized satellites to a 279 km (173 mi) orbit at an inclination of 53° to expand internet constellation. First booster to fly 35 missions, new record.								
649	June 11, 2026; 15:05	F9 B5; B1071‑34	Vandenberg, SLC‑4E	Starlink: Group 17-44	~13,800 kg (30,400 lb)	SSO	SpaceX	Success	Success (OCISLY)
649	Launch of 24 Starlink v2 mini satellites to a 281 km (175 mi) orbit at an inclination of 97° to expand internet constellation.								
650	June 12, 2026; 12:37	F9 B5; B1080‑27	Cape Canaveral, SLC‑40	Starlink: Group 10-54	~16,675 kg (36,762 lb)	LEO	SpaceX	Success	Success (ASOG)
650	Launch of 29 Starlink v2 mini optimized satellites to a 279 km (173 mi) orbit at an inclination of 53° to expand internet constellation.								
651	June 15, 2026; 15:34	F9 B5; B1093‑14	Vandenberg, SLC‑4E	Starlink: Group 17-54	~13,800 kg (30,400 lb)	SSO	SpaceX	Success	Success (OCISLY)
651	Launch of 24 Starlink v2 mini satellites to a 281 km (175 mi) orbit at an inclination of 97° to expand internet constellation.								
652	June 17, 2026; 06:39	F9 B5; B1077‑29	Cape Canaveral, SLC‑40	BlueBird Block 2 FM3-5 (3 Satellites, BlueBird 8 to 10)	~13,500 kg (29,800 lb)	LEO	AST SpaceMobile	Success	Success (ASOG)
652	Cellphone-compatible broadband constellation. The next-generation Block 2 BlueBird satellites delivers 10x the bandwidth of BlueBird Block 1 satellites, allowing continuous cellular broadband service coverage. They will feature a ~2,400 ft^{2} (220 m^{2}) communications array, the largest ever developed commercially.								
653	June 19, 2026; 08:50	F9 B5; B1103‑3	Vandenberg, SLC‑4E	NROL-179 (9 Starshield satellites)	Classified	LEO	NRO	Success	Success (LZ‑4)
653	Launch of SpaceX/Northrop Grumman-built Starshield satellites for the National Reconnaissance Office.								
654	June 21, 2026; 16:39	F9 B5; B1063‑33	Vandenberg, SLC‑4E	Starlink: Group 17-28	~13,800 kg (30,400 lb)	SSO	SpaceX	Success	Success (OCISLY)
654	Launch of 24 Starlink v2 mini satellites to a 281 km (175 mi) orbit at an inclination of 97° to expand internet constellation. 1st time flying a fairing half for the 37th time.								
655	June 23, 2026; 10:53	F9 B5; B1078‑29	Cape Canaveral, SLC‑40	SpaceX Starfall	Unknown	LEO	SpaceX	Success	Success (ASOG)
655	Maiden launch of Starfall as Starfall Demo. Starfall is SpaceX, mass-produced reentry vehicle designed to autonomously transport valuable payloads safely back from space to Earth, including for in-orbit manufacturing. Starfall is a cylindrical shaped capsule approximately 0.75 meters tall with a diameter of 3.1 meters, weighing approximately 2,100 kilograms, and capable of carrying 1,000 kilogram of payload. This mission was the ninth Falcon-family launch to use a second stage equipped with the medium mission-extension kit, required for a long coast phase between second-stage ignitions.								
656	June 25, 2026; 03:30	F9 B5; B1081‑25	Vandenberg, SLC‑4E	Starlink: Group 17-45	~13,800 kg (30,400 lb)	SSO	SpaceX	Success	Success (OCISLY)
656	Launch of 24 Starlink v2 mini satellites to a 281 km (175 mi) orbit at an inclination of 97° to expand internet constellation.								
657	June 28, 2026; 16:09	F9 B5; B1088‑17	Vandenberg, SLC‑4E	Starlink: Group 17-40	~13,800 kg (30,400 lb)	SSO	SpaceX	Success	Success (OCISLY)
657	Launch of 24 Starlink v2 mini satellites to a 281 km (175 mi) orbit at an inclination of 97° to expand internet constellation.								
658	June 29, 2026; 02:25	F9 B5; B1085‑17	Cape Canaveral, SLC‑40	SXM-11	7,000 kg (15,000 lb)	GTO	SiriusXM	Success	Success (ASOG)
658	High-powered, digital, audio radio satellite.								
659	July 2, 2026; 02:58	F9 B5; B1100‑7	Vandenberg, SLC‑4E	Starlink: Group 17-46	~13,800 kg (30,400 lb)	SSO	SpaceX	Success	Success (OCISLY)
659	Launch of 24 Starlink v2 mini satellites to a 281 km (175 mi) orbit at an inclination of 97° to expand internet constellation.								
660	July 5, 2026; 10:50	F9 B5; B1090‑13	Cape Canaveral, SLC‑40	Starlink: Group 10-50	~16,675 kg (36,762 lb)	LEO	SpaceX	Success	Success (ASOG)
660	July 5, 2026; 10:50	F9 B5; B1090‑13	Cape Canaveral, SLC‑40	Fabships Flight 1 (semiconductor test pods x 2)	~28 kg (62 lb)	Suborbital (max 115 km (71 mi))	Besxar Space Industries	Success	Success (ASOG)
660	Launch of 29 Starlink v2 mini optimized satellites to a 279 km (173 mi) orbit at an inclination of 53° to expand internet constellation. First of 12 suborbital rideshare flights where the first stage will house 2 semiconductor test pods in its interstage, called Fabships, for Besxar Space industries.								
661	July 7, 2026; 07:12	F9 B5; B1097‑11	Vandenberg, SLC‑4E	Transporter-17 (81 payloads smallsat rideshare)	Unknown	SSO	Various	Success	Success (OCISLY)
661	Dedicated SmallSat rideshare mission to sun-synchronous orbit.								
662	July 9, 2026; 09:25	F9 B5; B1067‑36	Cape Canaveral, SLC‑40	Starlink: Group 10-42	~16,675 kg (36,762 lb)	LEO	SpaceX	Success	Success (ASOG)
662	Launch of 29 Starlink v2 mini optimized satellites to a 279 km (173 mi) orbit at an inclination of 53° to expand internet constellation. First booster to fly 36 missions, new record.								
663	July 11, 2026; 03:01	F9 B5; B1071‑35	Vandenberg, SLC‑4E	Starlink: Group 17-48	~13,800 kg (30,400 lb)	SSO	SpaceX	Success	Success (OCISLY)
663	Launch of 24 Starlink v2 mini satellites to a 281 km (175 mi) orbit at an inclination of 97° to expand internet constellation.								
664	July 14, 2026; 01:28	F9 B5; B1093‑15	Vandenberg, SLC‑4E	Starlink: Group 15-14	~15,525 kg (34,227 lb)	LEO	SpaceX	Success	Success (OCISLY)
664	Launch of 27 Starlink v2 mini satellites to a 295 km (183 mi) orbit at an inclination of 70° to expand internet constellation.								
665	July 14, 2026; 09:10	F9 B5; B1080‑28	Cape Canaveral, SLC‑40	Starlink: Group 10-45	~16,675 kg (36,762 lb)	LEO	SpaceX	Success	Success (ASOG)
665	Launch of 29 Starlink v2 mini optimized satellites to a 279 km (173 mi) orbit at an inclination of 53° to expand internet constellation.								
666	July 16, 2026; 20:32	F9 B5; B1103‑4	Vandenberg, SLC‑4E	SDA Tranche 1 Transport Layer E (21 satellites)	Unknown	Polar LEO	SDA	Success	Success (OCISLY)
666	Launch part of Phase 2 US Space Force contract awarded in 2022.								
667	July 21, 2026; 14:49	F9 B5; B1082‑23	Vandenberg, SLC‑4E	Starlink: Group 17-39	~13,800 kg (30,400 lb)	SSO	SpaceX	Success	Success (OCISLY)
667	Launch of 24 Starlink v2 mini satellites to a 281 km (175 mi) orbit at an inclination of 97° to expand internet constellation.								
668	July 21, 2026; 21:15	F9 B5; B1069‑32	Cape Canaveral, SLC‑40	Mission Robotic Vehicle (MRV) × 1 Mission Extension Pod (MEP) × 3	~4,200 kg (9,300 lb)	GTO	Northrop Grumman	Success	No attempt
668	Developed from Northrop Grumman's 2,000 kg Mission Extension Vehicle architecture. One MEP (400 kg each) will be attached to Optus D3. First stage booster B1069 was expended on this mission due to additional performance, according to SpaceX.								
669	July 25, 2026; 15:51	F9 B5; B1100‑8	Vandenberg, SLC‑4E	Starlink: Group 17-51	~13,800 kg (30,400 lb)	SSO	SpaceX	Success	Success (OCISLY)
669	Launch of 24 Starlink v2 mini satellites to a 281 km (175 mi) orbit at an inclination of 97° to expand internet constellation. 1st time flying a fairing half for the 38th time.								
670	July 30, 2026; 07:10	F9 B5; B1096‑7	Cape Canaveral, SLC‑40	NROL-95	Unknown	LEO	NRO	Success	Success (LZ‑2)
670	Confidential mission for the National Reconnaissance Office.								
671	August 1, 2026; 03:08	F9 B5; B1081‑26	Vandenberg, SLC‑4E	Starlink: Group 17-52	~13,800 kg (30,400 lb)	SSO	SpaceX	Success	Success (OCISLY)
671	Launch of 24 Starlink v2 mini satellites to a 281 km (175 mi) orbit at an inclination of 97° to expand internet constellation.								
672	August 4, 2026; 17:05	F9 B5; B1063‑34	Vandenberg, SLC‑4E	Starlink: Group 17-53	~13,800 kg (30,400 lb)	SSO	SpaceX	Success	Success (OCISLY)
672	Launch of 24 Starlink v2 mini satellites to a 281 km (175 mi) orbit at an inclination of 97° to expand internet constellation.								
673	August 5, 2026; 07:49	F9 B5; B1077‑30	Cape Canaveral, SLC‑40	BlueBird Block 2 #11-13 (3 satellites)	~13,500 kg (29,800 lb)	LEO	AST SpaceMobile	Success	Success (ASOG)
673	Cellphone-compatible broadband constellation. The next-generation Block 2 BlueBird satellites delivers 10x the bandwidth of BlueBird Block 1 satellites, allowing continuous cellular broadband service coverage. They will feature a ~2,400 ft^{2} (220 m^{2}) communications array, the largest ever developed commercially.								
674	August 8, 2026; 16:35	F9 B5; B1093‑16	Vandenberg, SLC‑4E	Starlink: Group 17-38	~13,800 kg (30,400 lb)	SSO	SpaceX	Success	Success (OCISLY)
674	Launch of 24 Starlink v2 mini satellites to a 281 km (175 mi) orbit at an inclination of 97° to expand internet constellation.								
675	August 11, 2026; 15:58	F9 B5; B1085‑18	Cape Canaveral, SLC‑40	Starlink: Group 10-19	~16,675 kg (36,762 lb)	LEO	SpaceX	Success	Success (ASOG)
675	Launch of 29 Starlink v2 mini satellites to a 281 km (175 mi) orbit at an inclination of 53° to expand internet constellation.								
676	August 12, 2026; 04:46	F9 B5; B1103‑5	Vandenberg, SLC‑4E	Starlink: Group 17-49	~13,800 kg (30,400 lb)	SSO	SpaceX	Success	Success (OCISLY)
676	Launch of 24 Starlink v2 mini satellites to a 281 km (175 mi) orbit at an inclination of 97° to expand internet constellation.								
677	August 16, 2026; 01:12	F9 B5; B1090‑14	Cape Canaveral, SLC‑40	Globalstar-2R M104–111 (8 satellites)	4,000 kg (8,800 lb)	LEO	Globalstar	Success	Success (LZ‑40)
677	Globalstar Second generation replacement satellites constellation, launching to a 52 degree inclination orbit at an altitude of 1,410 km. The short-nozzle second stage was used for this mission.								
678	August 16, 2026; 01:50	F9 B5; B1088‑18	Vandenberg, SLC‑4E	USSF-366 (SBST R-1) (23 Starshield satellites)	Unknown	LEO	USSF	Success	Success (OCISLY)
678	Classified mission for the United States Space Force, suspected to be part of the new Starshield-based Space Data Network Backbone. It is possibly a batch of classified LEO satellites for a US government entity based on SpaceX's Starshield satellite bus. SpaceX set a new record for the shortest time between two Falcon launches at 38 minutes. The previous record time was 1 hours and 51 minutes, set between the Starlink Group 8-10 and 9-5 missions on August 31, 2024.								
679	August 19, 2026; 04:01	F9 B5; B1097‑12	Vandenberg, SLC‑4E	Starlink: Group 17-50	~13,800 kg (30,400 lb)	SSO	SpaceX	Success	Success (OCISLY)
679	Launch of 24 Starlink v2 mini satellites to a 281 km (175 mi) orbit at an inclination of 97° to expand internet constellation. 1st time flying a fairing half for the 39th time.								
680	August 21, 2026; 15:14	F9 B5; B1078‑30	Cape Canaveral, SLC‑40	Starlink: Group 10-39	~16,675 kg (36,762 lb)	LEO	SpaceX	Success	Success (ASOG)
680	Launch of 29 Starlink v2 mini satellites to a 281 km (175 mi) orbit at an inclination of 53° to expand internet constellation.								
681	August 22, 2026; 07:25	F9 B5; B1100‑9	Vandenberg, SLC‑4E	Starlink: Group 15-20	~15,525 kg (34,227 lb)	LEO	SpaceX	Success	Success (OCISLY)
681	Launch of 27 Starlink v2 mini satellites to a 295 km (183 mi) orbit at an inclination of 70° to expand internet constellation.								
682	August 25, 2026; 09:33	F9 B5; B1067‑37	Cape Canaveral, SLC‑40	Starlink: Group 10-49	~16,675 kg (36,762 lb)	LEO	SpaceX	Success	Success (ASOG)
682	Launch of 29 Starlink v2 mini optimized satellites to a 279 km (173 mi) orbit at an inclination of 53° to expand internet constellation. First booster to fly 37 missions, new record. Falcon 9 completes 100 launches this year. Fastest fairing turnaround time record by active fairing half, SN237, on its 9th flight, launching 9 days, 8 hours, and 21 minutes after the previous mission. Last east coast Starlink launch by Falcon 9.								
683	August 26, 2026; 09:35	F9 B5; B1082‑24	Vandenberg, SLC‑4E	Starlink: Group 15-22	~15,525 kg (34,227 lb)	LEO	SpaceX	Success	Success (OCISLY)
683	Launch of 27 Starlink v2 mini satellites to a 295 km (183 mi) orbit at an inclination of 70° to expand internet constellation.								
FH 13	August 30, 2026; 11:26	Falcon Heavy B5; B1105 (core)	Kennedy, LC‑39A	Nancy Grace Roman Space Telescope	9,174 kg (20,225 lb)	Sun–Earth L_{2}	NASA	Success	No attempt
FH 13	August 30, 2026; 11:26	B1072‑3 (side)	Kennedy, LC‑39A	Nancy Grace Roman Space Telescope	9,174 kg (20,225 lb)	Sun–Earth L_{2}	NASA	Success	Success (LZ‑2)
FH 13	August 30, 2026; 11:26	B1104‑1 (side)	Kennedy, LC‑39A	Nancy Grace Roman Space Telescope	9,174 kg (20,225 lb)	Sun–Earth L_{2}	NASA	Success	Success (LZ‑40)
FH 13	Launch of the Nancy Grace Roman Space Telescope — flagship-class infrared space telescope. One of two space telescopes donated by the NRO in 2012.								
684	September 2, 2026; 08:42	F9 B5; B1063‑35	Vandenberg, SLC‑4E	Starlink: Group 15-23	~15,525 kg (34,227 lb)	LEO	SpaceX	Success	Success (OCISLY)
684	Launch of 27 Starlink v2 mini satellites to a 295 km (183 mi) orbit at an inclination of 70° to expand internet constellation.								
685	September 6, 2026; 14:26	F9 B5; B1088‑19	Vandenberg, SLC‑4E	Starlink: Group 15-24	~15,525 kg (34,227 lb)	LEO	SpaceX	Success	Success (OCISLY)
685	Launch of 27 Starlink v2 mini satellites to a 295 km (183 mi) orbit at an inclination of 70° to expand internet constellation.								
686	September 10, 2026; 15:42	F9 B5; B1081‑27	Vandenberg, SLC‑4E	USSF-153 (SBST R-2) (23 Starshield satellites)	Unknown	LEO	USSF	Success	Success (OCISLY)
686	Classified mission for the United States Space Force, suspected to be part of the new Starshield-based Space Data Network Backbone. Second mission dedicated to the Space Force using SpaceX Starshield satellites.								
687	September 13, 2026; 18:49	F9 B5; B1080‑29	Cape Canaveral, SLC‑40	O3b mPOWER 11, 12 & 13	5,100 kg (11,200 lb)	MEO	SES	Success	Success (ASOG)
687	Two additional satellites were announced in October 2023 due to electrical issues discovered in the first four satellites of the constellation.								
688	September 17, 2026; 01:07	F9 B5; B1097‑13	Vandenberg, SLC‑4E	USSF-259 (SBST TH-1) (17 Starshield satellites)	Unknown	Polar LEO	USSF	Success	Success (OCISLY)
688	Classified mission for the United States Space Force. It is possibly a batch of classified LEO satellites for a US government entity based on SpaceX's Starshield satellite bus.								
689	September 20, 2026; 01:47	F9 B5; B1093‑17	Vandenberg, SLC‑4E	Starlink: Group 15-27	~15,525 kg (34,227 lb)	LEO	SpaceX	Success	Success (OCISLY)
689	Launch of 27 Starlink v2 mini satellites to a 295 km (183 mi) orbit at an inclination of 70° to expand internet constellation. 1st time flying a fairing half for the 40th time, becoming the most flown rocket stage to space.								
690	September 26, 2026; 14:00	F9 B5; B1100‑10	Vandenberg, SLC‑4E	USSF-385 ("R-3") (23 Starshield satellites)	Unknown	LEO	USSF	Success	Success (OCISLY)
690	Classified mission for the United States Space Force.								
691	October 1, 2026; 15:10	F9 B5; B1101‑3	Cape Canaveral, SLC‑40	Crew-13 (Crew Dragon C213-2 Grace)	~13,000 kg (29,000 lb)	LEO (ISS)	NASA (CTS)	Success	Success (LZ‑40)
691	In June 2022, NASA announced it purchased an additional 5 crewed flights (Crew-10 through Crew-14) from SpaceX in addition to the previous 9 missions on top of the $3.5 billion contract.								
692	October 1, 2026; 18:32	F9 B5; B1082‑25	Vandenberg, SLC‑4E	Transporter-18 (130 payloads smallsat rideshare)	Unknown	SSO	Various	Success	Success (LZ‑4)
692	Dedicated SmallSat rideshare mission to sun-synchronous orbit.								
FH 14	October 2, 2026; 03:54	Falcon Heavy B5; B1106 (core)	Kennedy, LC‑39A	NROL-97	Classified	Classified	NRO	Success	No attempt
FH 14	October 2, 2026; 03:54	B1072‑4 (side)	Kennedy, LC‑39A	NROL-97	Classified	Classified	NRO	Success	Success (LZ‑2)
FH 14	October 2, 2026; 03:54	B1104‑2 (side)	Kennedy, LC‑39A	NROL-97	Classified	Classified	NRO	Success	Success (LZ‑1)
FH 14	Launch is part of Phase 3 Lane 2 US Space Force contract awarded in 2025. First NRO launch on a Falcon Heavy. Fastest turnaround for a Falcon Heavy Launch. First time all four SpaceX ground landing zones (LZ-1, LZ-2, LZ-4 and LZ-40) hosted Falcon booster landings within 24 hours. Although LZ-1 stays retired, it was temporarily reactivated to assist booster landings for this mission, as LZ-40 was already occupied by the booster used during SpaceX's Crew-13 mission. This mission was the tenth Falcon-family launch to use a second stage equipped with the medium mission-extension kit, required for a long coast phase between second-stage ignitions.								
693	October 10, 2026; 07:39	F9 B5; B1103‑6	Vandenberg, SLC‑4E	SDA Tranche 1 Transport Layer A (21 satellites)	Unknown	Polar LEO	SDA	Success	Success (LZ‑4)
693	Launch part of Phase 2 US Space Force contract awarded in 2022.								
694	October 13, 2026; 00:28	F9 B5; B1088‑20	Vandenberg, SLC‑4E	Starlink: Group 15-25	~15,525 kg (34,227 lb)	LEO	SpaceX	Success	Success (OCISLY)
694	Launch of 27 Starlink v2 mini satellites to a 295 km (183 mi) orbit at an inclination of 70° to expand internet constellation.								
695	October 13, 2026; 10:33	F9 B5; B1096‑8	Cape Canaveral, SLC‑40	SpaceX CRS-35 (Dragon C211-4)	3,300 kg (7,300 lb)	LEO (ISS)	NASA (CRS)	Success	Success (LZ‑40)
695	Last of six additional CRS-2 missions for Dragon 2 which were announced in March 2022, resupplying the ISS until 2026. The contract has since been extended to 2030. Carried 3,300 kg (7,300 lb) of cargo and supplies to the International Space Station (ISS).								
696	October 16, 2026; 00:01	F9 B5; B1081‑28	Vandenberg, SLC‑4E	USSF-481 (TH-2) (17 Starshield satellites)	Unknown	Polar LEO	USSF	Success	Success (OCISLY)
696	Classified mission for the United States Space Force.								
697	October 20, 2026; 11:04	F9 B5; B1085‑19	Cape Canaveral, SLC‑40	Bandwagon-5 (32 Payloads)	Unknown	LEO	Various	Success	Success (ASOG)
697	Dedicated SmallSat Rideshare mission to 45 degree inclination 550–600 km altitude. Carried 2nd Starfall demo mission.								
698	October 23, 2026; 22:48	F9 B5; B1063‑36	Vandenberg, SLC‑4E	Starlink: Group 15-15	~15,525 kg (34,227 lb)	LEO	SpaceX	Success	Success (OCISLY)
698	Launch of 27 Starlink v2 mini satellites to a 295 km (183 mi) orbit at an inclination of 70° to expand internet constellation.								
699	October 27, 2026; 07:25	F9 B5; B1082‑26	Vandenberg, SLC‑4E	Starlink: Group 15-16	~15,525 kg (34,227 lb)	LEO	SpaceX	Success	Success (OCISLY)
699	Launch of 27 Starlink v2 mini satellites to a 295 km (183 mi) orbit at an inclination of 70° to expand internet constellation.								
700	October 31, 2026; 04:04	F9 B5; B1093‑18	Vandenberg, SLC‑4E	Starlink: Group 15-18	~15,525 kg (34,227 lb)	LEO	SpaceX	Success	Success (OCISLY)
700	Launch of 27 Starlink v2 mini satellites to a 295 km (183 mi) orbit at an inclination of 70° to expand internet constellation.								
701	November 7, 2026; 00:48	F9 B5; B1095‑8	Vandenberg, SLC‑4E	USSF-432 ("R-4") (~23 Starshield satellites)	Unknown	LEO	USSF	Success	Success (OCISLY)
701	Classified mission for the United States Space Force.								
702	November 12, 2026; 04:36	F9 B5; B1103‑7	Vandenberg, SLC‑4E	USSF-627 ("R-5") (~23 Starshield satellites)	Unknown	LEO	USSF	Success	Success (OCISLY)
702	Classified mission for the United States Space Force.								
703	November 21, 2026; 04:20	F9 B5; B1100‑11	Vandenberg, SLC‑4E	USSF-317 ("R-6")	Unknown	LEO	USSF	Success	Success (OCISLY)
703	Classified mission for the United States Space Force.								
704	November 22, 2026; 12:23	F9 B5; B1097‑14	Vandenberg, SLC‑4E	NROL-136	Unknown	LEO	NRO	Success	Success (LZ‑4)
704	Launch of SpaceX/Northrop Grumman-built Starshield satellites for the National Reconnaissance Office. Mission launched just 1 day, 8 hours, 3 minutes and 21 seconds after SpaceX' previous launch from SLC-4E, marking their fastest pad turnaround to date. It broke their previous record for SLC-4E by ~23 hours, and their fastest overall at SLC-40 by ~13 hours.								

== Future launches ==
Future launches are listed chronologically when firm plans are in place. The order of the later launches is much less certain. Tentative launch dates and mission details are sourced from multiple locations. Launches are expected to take place "no earlier than" (NET) the listed date.

=== 2026, future ===
Date and time (UTC)	Version, booster	Launch site	Payload	Orbit	Customer
November 24, 2026; 15:55	F9 B5; B1081‑29	Vandenberg, SLC‑4E	USSF-266 ("TH-3")	Polar LEO	USSF
November 24, 2026; 15:55	Classified mission for the United States Space Force.				
November 29, 2026; 04:39	F9 B5; B1082‑27	Vandenberg, SLC‑4E	USSF-380 ("R-7")	LEO	USSF
November 29, 2026; 04:39	Classified mission for the United States Space Force.				
November 29, 2026; 15:50	F9 B5; B1096‑9	Cape Canaveral, SLC‑40	Cygnus NG-25	LEO (ISS)	NASA (CRS)
November 29, 2026; 15:50	Cargo Resupply to ISS using Cygnus spacecraft.				
December 2026	F9 B5	Vandenberg, SLC‑4E	OneWeb #21 (32 Satellites)	PO	Eutelsat
December 2026	First expansion of constellation since initial 652 satellites launches completed Oct 2024.				
December 2026	F9 B5	Vandenberg, SLC‑4E	Starlink: Group 15-21	LEO	SpaceX
December 2026	Launch of 27 Starlink v2 mini satellites to a 295 km (183 mi) orbit at an inclination of 70° to expand internet constellation.				
December 2026	F9 B5	Vandenberg, SLC‑4E	NROL-195	LEO	NRO
December 2026	Launch of SpaceX/Northrop Grumman-built Starshield satellites for the National Reconnaissance Office.				
Q4 2026	F9 B5	Vandenberg, SLC‑4E	SDA Tranche 1 Transport Layer D	Polar LEO	SDA
Q4 2026	Launch part of Phase 2 US Space Force contract awarded in 2022.				
Q4 2026	F9 B5	Vandenberg, SLC‑4E	SDA Tranche 1 Tracking Layer C	Polar LEO	SDA
Q4 2026	Launch part of Phase 2 US Space Force contract awarded in 2022.				
Q4 2026	F9 B5	Vandenberg, SLC‑4E	SDA Tranche 1 Transport Layer F	Polar LEO	SDA
Q4 2026	Launch part of Phase 2 US Space Force contract awarded in 2022.				
Q4 2026	F9 B5	Cape Canaveral, SLC‑40	CHORUS	LEO	MDA
Q4 2026	Announced in October 2023, CHORUS will be a commercial Earth observation constellation owned and operated by MDA Ltd. Will use C and X-band SAR.				
Q4 2026	F9 B5	Cape Canaveral, SLC‑40	Bluebird Block 2 14-16	LEO	AST SpaceMobile
Q4 2026	Cargo Resupply to ISS using Cygnus spacecraft.				
2026	F9 B5	Cape Canaveral, SLC‑40	Globalstar-2R M113–120 (8 satellites)	LEO	Globalstar
2026	Globalstar Second generation replacement satellites constellation, launching to a 52 degree inclination orbit at an altitude of 1,410 km.				
2026	F9 B5	Cape Canaveral, SLC‑40	USSF-31	TBA	USSF
2026	Classified mission, part of Phase 2 US Space Force contract awarded in 2022.				
2026	F9 B5	Vandenberg, SLC‑4E	SDA Tranche 1 Tracking Layer A	Polar LEO	SDA
2026	Launch part of Phase 2 US Space Force contract awarded in 2022.				
2026	F9 B5	Vandenberg, SLC‑4E	SDA Tranche 1 Tracking Layer D	Polar LEO	SDA
2026	Launch part of Phase 2 US Space Force contract awarded in 2022.				
Late 2026	Falcon Heavy B5; B1091‑x (core)	Kennedy, LC‑39A	Griffin Mission 1	TLI	Astrobotic; NASA (Artemis)
Late 2026	B1072‑x (side)	Kennedy, LC‑39A	Griffin Mission 1	TLI	Astrobotic; NASA (Artemis)
Late 2026	B10?? (side)	Kennedy, LC‑39A	Griffin Mission 1	TLI	Astrobotic; NASA (Artemis)
Late 2026	Astrobotic's Griffin lunar lander was originally expected to deliver NASA's VIPER rover to the lunar south pole prior to its cancellation. Booster recovery method is unconfirmed, but could possibly feature the first Falcon Heavy center core recovery attempt since STP-2. Amidst cost growth and delays to readiness of the rover and the Griffin lander, the VIPER program was ended in July 2024, with the rover planned to be disassembled and its instruments and components reused for other lunar missions. NASA expects the primary objectives of VIPER to be fulfilled by an array of other missions planned for the next several years. NASA indicated it would continue to support the Griffin lander to go to the moon even if this meant a mass simulator in place of the VIPER rover. Astrolab's FLIP rover is to replace the VIPER rover.				

=== 2027 and beyond ===
Date and time (UTC)	Version, booster	Launch site	Payload	Orbit	Customer
January 2027	F9 B5	Cape Canaveral,SLC-40	Axiom Mission 5	LEO (ISS)	NASA / Axiom Space (ISS)
January 2027	Ax-5 is Axiom Space's fifth private crew rotation to the International Space Station aboard a SpaceX Crew Dragon spacecraft.				
February 2027	F9 B5	Cape Canaveral,SLC-40	SICRAL-3A	GTO	Ministry of Defence (Italy)
February 2027	Geostationary satellites for confidential strategic and tactical communications, to support defence missions both in Italy and abroad.				
Early 2027	F9 B5	Cape Canaveral,SLC-40	IM-3 Nova-C lunar lander	TLI	NASA (CLPS); Intuitive Machines
Early 2027	Third mission for Intuitive Machines, with multiple rideshare payloads. This mission was selected by NASA under the CLPS program in November 2021.				
Q1 2027	F9 B5	TBD	Transporter-19 (smallsat rideshare)	SSO	Various
Q1 2027	Dedicated SmallSat rideshare mission to sun-synchronous orbit.				
Q2 2027	F9 B5	Vandenberg, SLC‑4E	SDA Tranche 2 Transport layer E	Polar LEO	SDA
Q2 2027	Launch is part of Phase 2 US Air Force contract awarded in 2022.				
Q2 2027	F9 B5	Vandenberg, SLC‑4E	SDA Tranche 2 Transport layer A	Polar LEO	SDA
Q2 2027	Launch is part of Phase 2 US Air Force contract awarded in 2022.				
Q2 2027	F9 B5	Vandenberg, SLC‑4E	SDA Tranche 2 Transport layer C	Polar LEO	SDA
Q2 2027	Launch is part of Phase 2 US Air Force contract awarded in 2022.				
Q2 2027	F9 B5	Vandenberg, SLC‑4E	SDA Tranche 2 Transport layer D	Polar LEO	SDA
Q2 2027	Launch is part of Phase 2 US Air Force contract awarded in 2022.				
Q2 2027	F9 B5	TBD	Transporter-20 (smallsat rideshare)	SSO	Various
Q2 2027	Dedicated SmallSat rideshare mission to sun-synchronous orbit.				
H1 2027	F9 B5	Vandenberg, SLC‑4E	SDA Tranche 2 Transport layer F	Polar LEO	SDA
H1 2027	Launch is part of Phase 2 US Air Force contract awarded in 2022.				
H1 2027	F9 B5	Vandenberg, SLC‑4E	SDA Tranche 2 Transport layer G	Polar LEO	SDA
H1 2027	Launch is part of Phase 2 US Air Force contract awarded in 2022.				
H1 2027	F9 B5	Vandenberg, SLC‑4E	SDA Tranche 2 Transport layer H	Polar LEO	SDA
H1 2027	Launch is part of Phase 2 US Air Force contract awarded in 2022.				
August 2027	F9 B5	TBA (FL)	COSI	LEO	NASA
August 2027	Compton Spectrometer and Imager (COSI).				
October 2027	F9 B5	Cape Canaveral, SLC‑40	Arabsat 7A	GTO	Arabsat
October 2027	Announced in September 2022, Arabsat 7A will enter a geostationary orbit after its launch by a Falcon 9 rocket.				
December 2027	F9 B5	Cape Canaveral, SLC‑40	KOMPSAT-7A	SSO	Korea Aerospace Research Institute
December 2027	A lightweight Earth observation satellite.				
Q4 2027	F9 B5	TBD	Transporter-21 (smallsat rideshare)	SSO	Various
Q4 2027	Dedicated SmallSat rideshare mission to sun-synchronous orbit.				
Q4 2027	F9 B5	Cape Canaveral,SLC-40	SICRAL-3B	GTO	Ministry of Defence (Italy)
Q4 2027	Geostationary satellites for confidential strategic and tactical communications, to support defence missions both in Italy and abroad.				
H2 2027	F9 B5	TBA (FL)	GEO-KOMPSAT-3	GTO	KASA
H2 2027	Also known as Cheollian-3. A South Korean communication satellite with a mass of 3.7 tonnes, replacing GEO-Kompsat-1.				
2027	F9 B5	Cape Canaveral, SLC‑40	Astranis Block 3 Mission (5 satellites)	GTO	Astranis
2027	5 MicroGEO satellites.				
2027	F9 B5	Cape Canaveral, SLC‑40	GX-7 (Inmarsat-7 F1)	GTO	ViaSat
2027	New generation Ka band satellite. When announced in 2019 were expected to be launched in 2023 but has suffered delays.				
2027	F9 B5	Vandenberg, SLC‑4E	SDA Tranche 2 Transport layer I	Polar LEO	SDA
2027	Launch is part of Phase 2 US Air Force contract awarded in 2022.				
2027	F9 B5	Vandenberg, SLC‑4E	SDA Tranche 2 Transport layer J	Polar LEO	SDA
2027	Launch is part of Phase 2 US Air Force contract awarded in 2022.				
2027	F9 B5	Cape Canaveral, SLC‑40	Blue Ghost Mission 2	TLI	NASA (CLPS)
2027	Firefly Aerospace's lunar lander as a CLPS payload debuts a new two-stage version of Blue Ghost using an Elytra Dark orbital vehicle. European Space Agency’s Lunar Pathfinder communications satellite has been integrated into the Elytra Dark vehicle.				
2027	F9 B5	Cape Canaveral, SLC‑40	LeoSat × 24 (LF-04)	LEO	Amazon (Amazon Leo)
2027	Previously Project Kuiper is now known as Amazon Leo.				
2027	F9 B5	Cape Canaveral, SLC‑40	LeoSat × 24 (LF-05)	LEO	Amazon (Amazon Leo)
2027	Previously Project Kuiper is now known as Amazon Leo.				
2027	F9 B5	Cape Canaveral, SLC‑40	LeoSat × 24 (LF-06)	LEO	Amazon (Amazon Leo)
2027	Previously Project Kuiper is now known as Amazon Leo.				
2027	F9 B5	Cape Canaveral, SLC‑40	LeoSat × 24 (LF-07)	LEO	Amazon (Amazon Leo)
2027	Previously Project Kuiper is now known as Amazon Leo.				
2027	F9 B5	Cape Canaveral, SLC‑40	LeoSat × 24 (LF-08)	LEO	Amazon (Amazon Leo)
2027	Previously Project Kuiper is now known as Amazon Leo.				
2027	F9 B5	Cape Canaveral, SLC‑40	LeoSat × 24 (LF-09)	LEO	Amazon (Amazon Leo)
2027	Previously Project Kuiper is now known as Amazon Leo.				
2027	F9 B5	Cape Canaveral, SLC‑40	LeoSat × 24 (LF-10)	LEO	Amazon (Amazon Leo)
2027	Previously Project Kuiper is now known as Amazon Leo.				
2027	F9 B5	Cape Canaveral, SLC‑40	LeoSat × 24 (LF-11)	LEO	Amazon (Amazon Leo)
2027	Previously Project Kuiper is now known as Amazon Leo.				
2027	F9 B5	Cape Canaveral, SLC‑40	LeoSat × 24 (LF-12)	LEO	Amazon (Amazon Leo)
2027	Previously Project Kuiper is now known as Amazon Leo.				
2027	F9 B5	Cape Canaveral, SLC‑40	LeoSat × 24 (LF-13)	LEO	Amazon (Amazon Leo)
2027	Previously Project Kuiper is now known as Amazon Leo.				
2027	F9 B5	Cape Canaveral, SLC‑40	Skynet 6A	GTO	Airbus / UK Ministry of Defence
2027	British military communications satellite ordered to bridge the gap between Skynet-5 and its successor.				
2027	F9 B5	TBA	VICTUS SURGO	LEO	Impulse Space USSF
2027	Aimed at demonstrating how maneuverable on-orbit assets can enhance responsive launch approaches to meet urgent military needs. First use of Impulse Space's Helios high-energy kick stage which will be deployed in LEO and carry the payloads to GTO and GEO. DIU will co-sponsor a rideshare slot on Helios.				
2027	F9 B5	Kennedy, LC‑39A	APEX 1.0	TLI	NASA (CLPS) ispace-U.S. Draper
2027	ispace Mission 3 (Team Draper Commercial Mission 1). APEX 1.0 lunar lander and two lunar relay satellites (Alpine and Lupine).				
2027	F9 B5	TBA	FOO Fighter (8 payloads)	LEO	SDA
2027	Fire-control On Orbit-support-to-the-war Fighter program tasked with detecting, providing warning and tracking of what SDA refers to as "advanced missile threats".				
2027	F9 B5	TBD	Haven-1	LEO	Vast
2027	Launch of a new commercial space station by Vast Space.				
2027	F9 B5	TBA (FL)	Vast-1	LEO	Vast
2027	First crewed mission to the Haven-1 space station.				
2027	F9 B5	TBA (FL)	Crew-14	LEO (ISS)	NASA (ISS)
2027	In June 2022, NASA announced it purchased an additional 5 crewed flights (Crew-10 through Crew-14) from SpaceX in addition to the previous 9 missions on top of the $3.5 billion contract.				
2027 and later (14 flights)	F9 B5	TBD	Telesat Lightspeed × 18	LEO	Telesat
2027 and later (14 flights)	Announced in September 2023, Telesat has booked 14 launches of up to 18 satellites each.				
2027	F9 B5	Vandenberg, SLC‑4E	TSIS-2 & others	SSO	NASA
2027	NASA's Total and Spectral Solar Irradiance Sensor – 2. Rideshares include: SunCET, CubIXSS, SPARCS, and others.				
2027	F9 B5	Vandenberg, SLC‑4E	NROL-96	Classified	NRO
2027	Launch is part of Phase 3 Lane 2 US Space Force contract awarded in 2025.				
2027	F9 B5	Vandenberg, SLC‑4E	NROL-157	Classified	NRO
2027	Launch is part of Phase 3 Lane 2 US Space Force contract awarded in 2025.				
2027	Falcon Heavy B5	Kennedy, LC‑39A	USSF-186	TBA	USSF
2027	Classified mission, part of Phase 3 Lane 2 US Space Force contract awarded in 2025.				
2027	F9 B5	TBA (FL)	USSF-234	TBA	USSF
2027	Classified mission, part of Phase 3 Lane 2 US Space Force contract awarded in 2025.				
2027	Falcon Heavy B5	Kennedy, LC‑39A	USSF-174	TBA	USSF
2027	Classified mission, part of Phase 3 Lane 2 US Space Force contract awarded in 2025.				
2027	Falcon Heavy B5	Kennedy, LC‑39A	USSF-206 (WGS-12)	GTO	USSF
2027	Launch is part of Phase 3 Lane 2 US Space Force contract awarded in 2025.				
2027	Falcon Heavy B5	Kennedy, LC‑39A	USSF-155	TBA	USSF
2027	Launch is part of Phase 3 Lane 2 US Space Force contract awarded in 2025.				
2027	F9 B5	TBA (FL)	USSF-149	TBA	USSF
2027	Launch is part of Phase 3 Lane 2 US Space Force contract awarded in 2025.				
2027	Falcon Heavy B5	Kennedy, LC‑39A	USSF-63	TBA	USSF
2027	Launch is part of Phase 3 Lane 2 US Space Force contract awarded in 2025.				
2027	Falcon Heavy B5	Kennedy, LC‑39A	NROL-86	TBA	NRO
2027	Launch is part of Phase 3 Lane 2 US Space Force contract awarded in 2025.				
H2 2027	F9 B5	Cape Canaveral, SLC‑40	Al Yah 4	GTO	Yahsat
H2 2027	Replacement for Al Yah 1.				
2027	F9 B5	Vandenberg, SLC‑4E	JPSS-4	SSO	NOAA
2027	Joint Polar Satellite System (JPSS).				
2027	F9 B5	Cape Canaveral, SLC‑40	Thaicom-10	GTO	Thaicom
2027	Falcon Heavy B5	Kennedy, LC‑39A	USSF-75	GSO	USSF
2027	F9 B5	TBA	IM-4	TLI	NASA (CLPS); Intuitive Machines
2027	Two lunar relay satellites and IM-4 lunar lander.				
2027	Falcon Heavy B5	Kennedy, LC‑39A	Griffin Mission 2 - Lunar Lander	TLI	Astrobotic Technology
2027	Astrobotic Technology's third planned lander mission to the Moon. Targeting a South Pole landing for a follow up mission to Griffin Mission 1.				
July 5, 2028	Falcon Heavy B5	Kennedy, LC‑39A	Dragonfly	Heliocentric	NASA (New Frontiers Program)
July 5, 2028	Awarded in November 2024. The Dragonfly robotic rotorcraft will fly over the surface of Titan, Saturn's largest moon. The launch will cost NASA $256.6 million. First Falcon mission to carry an RTG.				
October, 2028	Falcon Heavy B5	Kennedy, LC‑39A	ExoMars Rosalind Franklin (rover)	Heliocentric	ESA/NASA
October, 2028	European Mars rover.				
FY 2028	F9 B5	TBA (FL)	NEO Surveyor	Sun–Earth L_{1}	NASA
FY 2028	Space-based infrared telescope designed to survey for potentially hazardous asteroids.				
H2 2028	F9 B5	Cape Canaveral, SLC‑40	Al Yah 5	GTO	Yahsat
H2 2028	Replacement for Al Yah 2.				
2028–2030 (3 flights)	F9 B5	TBA (FL)	Crew-15 to Crew-17	LEO (ISS)	NASA (ISS)
2028–2030 (3 flights)	In September 2026, NASA announced it purchased an additional 3 crewed flights (Crew-15 through Crew-17) from SpaceX in addition to the previous 14 missions.				
July 2029	F9 B5	TBD	GRACE-C1, C2	Polar LEO	NASA / DLR
July 2029	Gravity Recovery And Climate Experiment-Continuity (GRACE-C).				

== Notable launches ==
=== First flights and contracts ===
Launch of Falcon 9 Flight 1 with a boilerplate Dragon

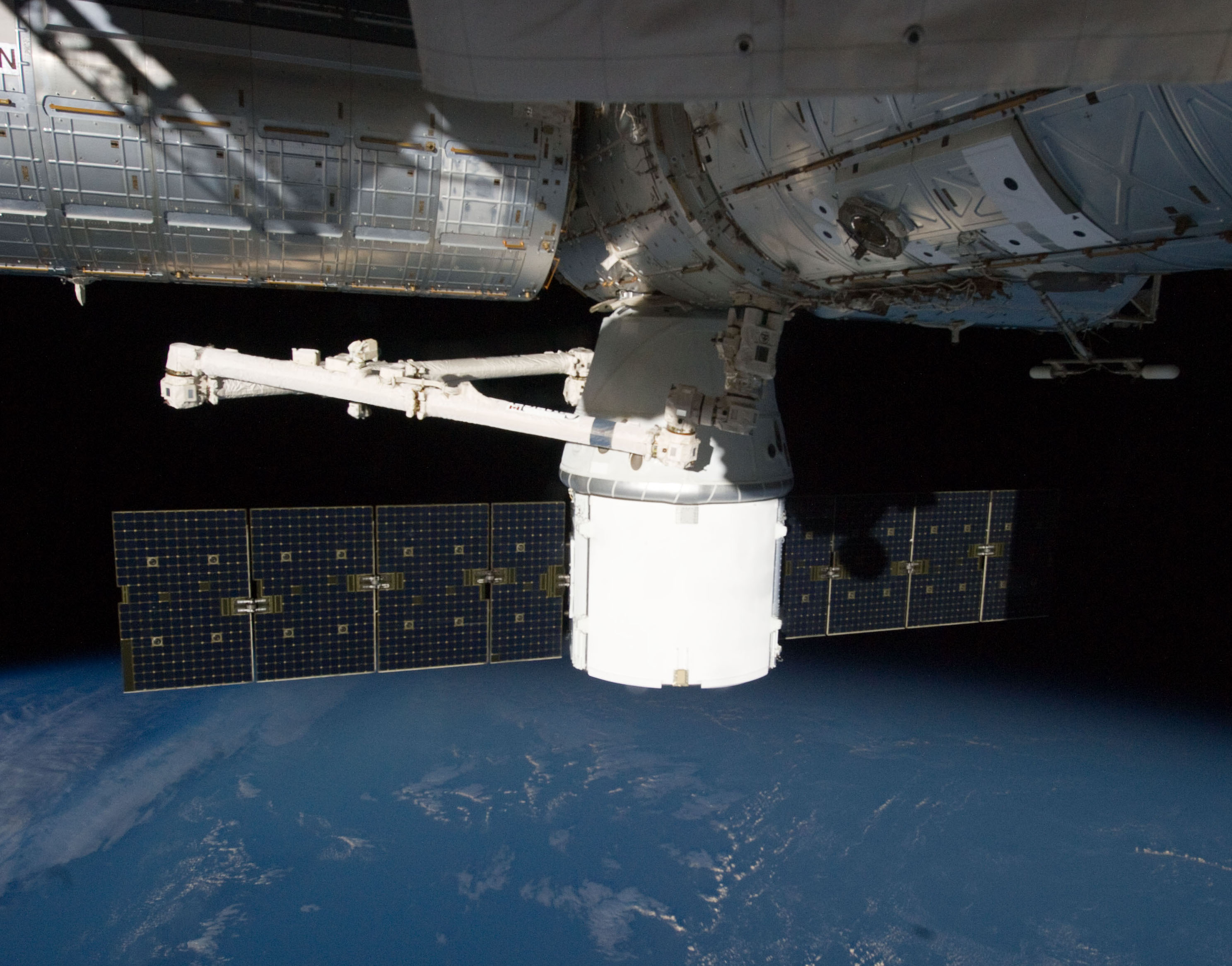
Dragon CRS-1 berthed to the International Space Station (ISS) on October 14, 2012, photographed from the Cupola.

On June 4, 2010, the first Falcon 9 launch successfully placed a test payload into the intended orbit. The second launch of Falcon 9 was COTS Demo Flight 1, which placed an operational Dragon capsule in orbit on December 8, 2010. The capsule re-entered the atmosphere after two orbits, allowing for testing the reentry procedures. The capsule was recovered off the coast of Mexico and then placed on display at SpaceX headquarters. The remaining objectives of the NASA COTS qualification program were combined into a single Dragon C2+ mission, on the condition that all milestones would be validated in space before berthing Dragon to the ISS. The Dragon capsule was propelled to orbit in May 2012, and following successful tests in the next days it was grabbed with the station's robotic arm (Canadarm2) and docked to the ISS docking port for the first time on May 25. After successfully completing all the return procedures, the recovered Dragon C2+ capsule was put on display at Kennedy Space Center. Thus, Falcon 9 and Dragon became the first fully commercially developed launcher to deliver a payload to the International Space Station, paving the way for SpaceX and NASA to sign the first Commercial Resupply Services agreement for cargo deliveries.

The first operational cargo resupply mission to ISS, the fourth flight of Falcon 9, was launched in October 2012. An engine suffered a loss of pressure at 76 seconds after liftoff, which caused an automatic shutdown of that engine, but the remaining eight first-stage engines continued to burn and the Dragon capsule reached orbit successfully and thus demonstrated the rocket's "engine out" capability in flight. Due to ISS visiting vehicle safety rules, at NASA's request, the secondary payload Orbcomm-2 was released into a lower-than-intended orbit. Despite this incident, Orbcomm said they gathered useful test data from the mission and later in 2014, launched more satellites via SpaceX. The mission continued to rendezvous and berth the Dragon capsule with the ISS where the ISS crew unloaded its payload and reloaded the spacecraft with cargo for return to Earth.

Following unsuccessful attempts at recovering the first stage with parachutes, SpaceX upgraded to a much larger first stage booster and with greater thrust, termed Falcon 9 v1.1, and performed a demonstration flight of this version in September 2013. After the second stage separation and delivering CASSIOPE, a very small payload relative to the rocket's capability, SpaceX conducted a novel high-altitude, high-velocity flight test wherein the booster attempted to reenter the lower atmosphere in a controlled manner and decelerate to a simulated over-water landing.

=== Loss of CRS-7 mission ===
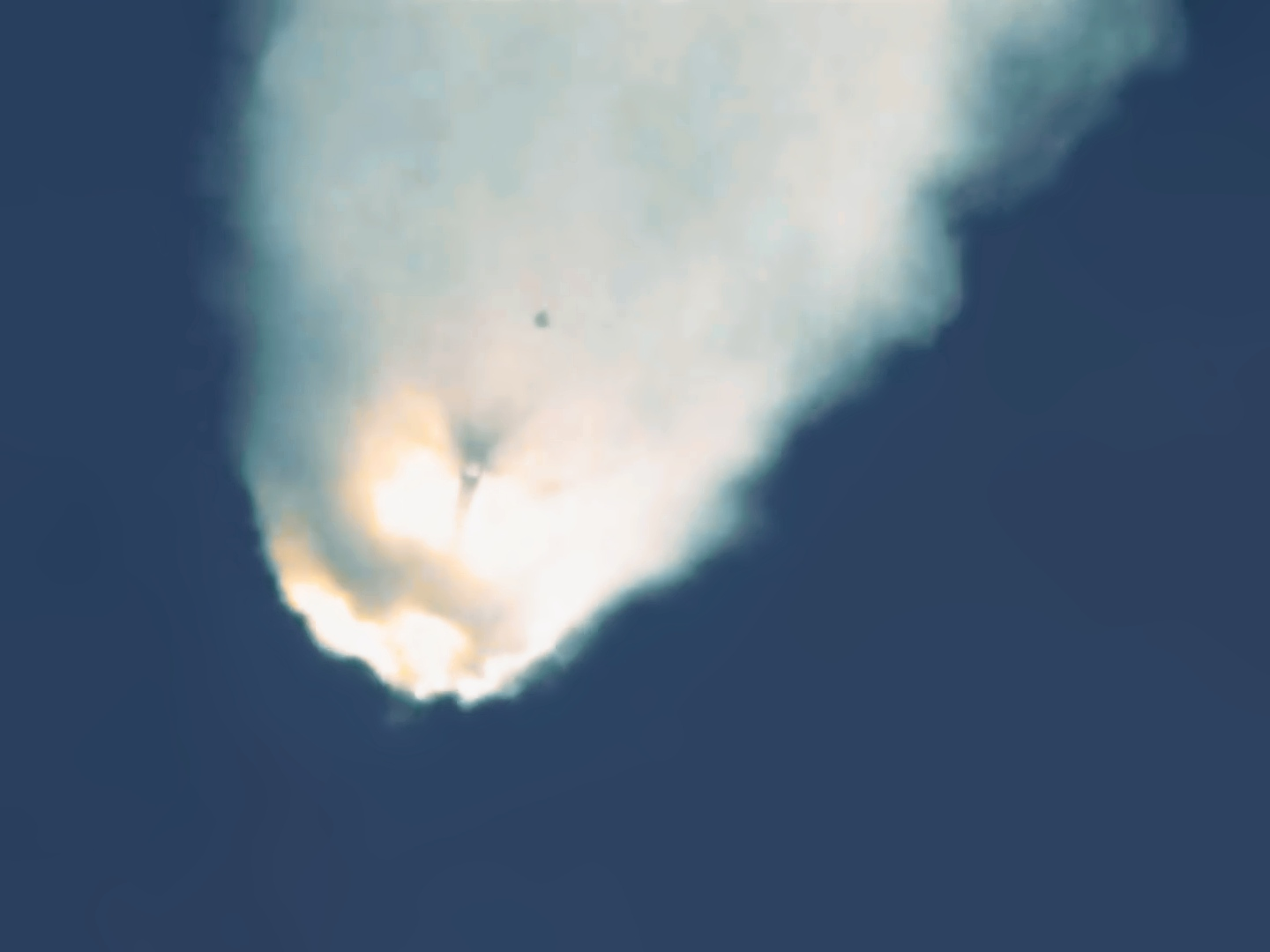
SpaceX CRS-7 disintegrating two minutes after liftoff, as seen from a NASA tracking camera.

In June 2015, Falcon 9 Flight 19 carried a Dragon capsule on the seventh Commercial Resupply Services mission to the ISS. The second stage disintegrated due to an internal helium tank failure while the first stage was still burning normally. This was the first (and only as of May 2024) primary mission loss for any Falcon 9 rocket. In addition to ISS consumables and experiments, this mission carried the first International Docking Adapter (IDA-1), whose loss delayed preparedness of the station's US Orbital Segment (USOS) for future crewed missions.

Performance was nominal until T+140 seconds into launch when a cloud of white vapor appeared, followed by rapid loss of second-stage LOX tank pressure. The booster continued on its trajectory until complete vehicle breakup at T+150 seconds. The Dragon capsule was ejected from the disintegrating rocket and continued transmitting data until impact with the ocean. SpaceX officials stated that the capsule could have been recovered if the parachutes had deployed; however, the Dragon software did not include any provisions for parachute deployment in this situation. Subsequent investigations traced the cause of the accident to the failure of a strut that secured a helium bottle inside the second-stage LOX tank. With the helium pressurization system integrity breached, excess helium quickly flooded the tank, eventually causing it to burst from overpressure. NASA's independent accident investigation into the loss of SpaceX CRS-7 found that the failure of the strut which led to the breakup of the Falcon-9 represented a design error. Specifically, that industrial grade stainless steel had been used in a critical load path under cryogenic conditions and flight conditions, without additional part screening, and without regard to manufacturer recommendations.

=== Full-thrust version and first booster landings ===
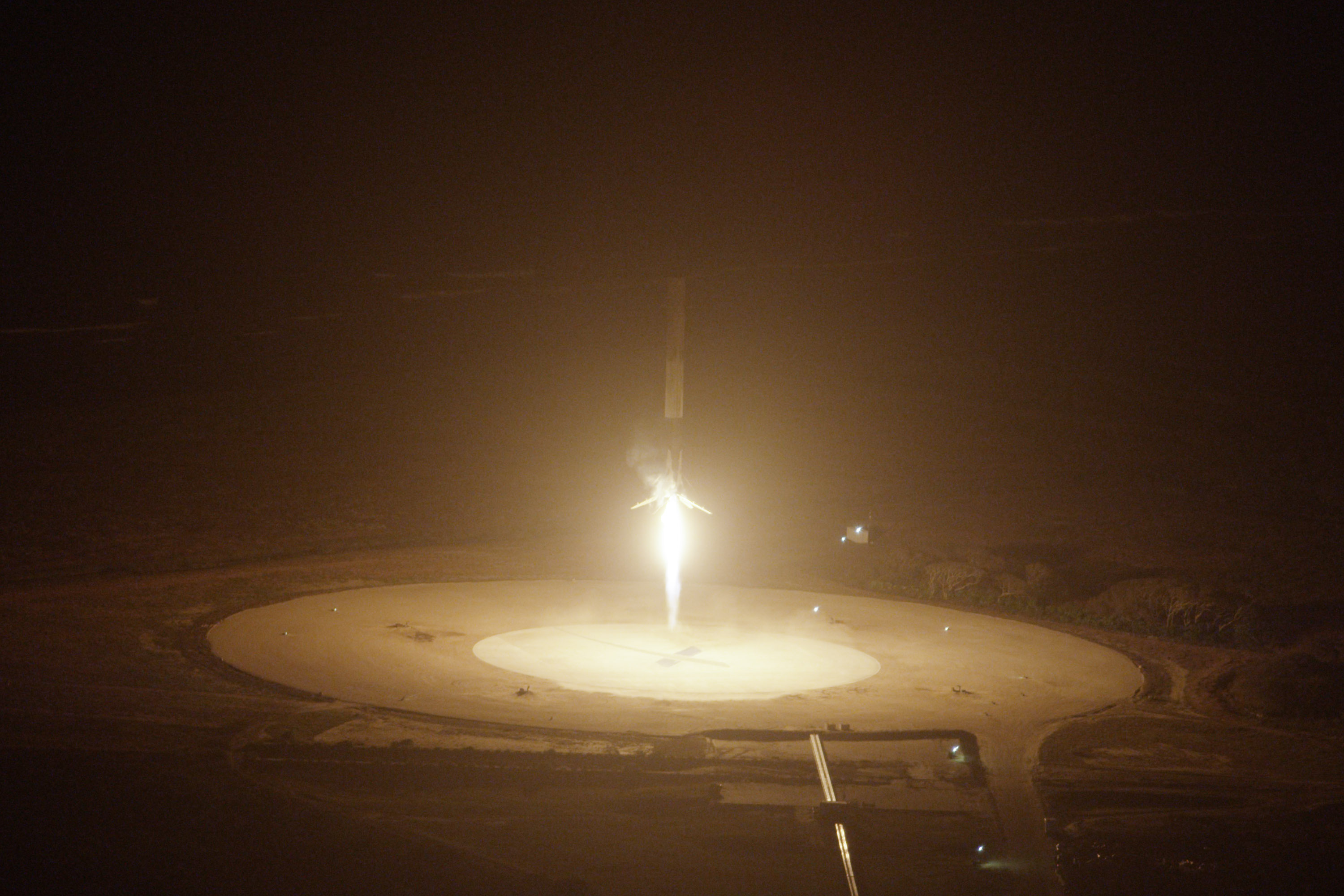
Falcon 9 Flight 20 historic first-stage landing at CCSFS Landing Zone 1, December 22, 2015

After pausing launches for months, SpaceX launched on December 22, 2015, the highly anticipated return-to-flight mission after the loss of CRS-7. This launch inaugurated a new Falcon 9 Full Thrust version of its flagship rocket featuring increased performance, notably thanks to subcooling of the propellants. After launching a constellation of 11 Orbcomm-OG2 second-generation satellites, the first stage performed a controlled-descent and landing test for the eighth time, SpaceX attempted to land the booster on land for the first time. It managed to return the first stage successfully to the Landing Zone 1 at Cape Canaveral, marking the first successful recovery of a rocket first stage that launched a payload to orbit. After recovery, the first stage booster performed further ground tests and then was put on permanent display outside SpaceX's headquarters in Hawthorne, California.

On April 8, 2016, SpaceX delivered its commercial resupply mission to the International Space Station marking the return-to-flight of the Dragon capsule, after the loss of CRS-7. After separation, the first-stage booster slowed itself with a boostback maneuver, re-entered the atmosphere, executed an automated controlled descent and landed vertically onto the drone ship Of Course I Still Love You, marking the first successful landing of a rocket on a ship at sea. This was the fourth attempt to land on a drone ship, as part of the company's experimental controlled-descent and landing tests.

=== Loss of AMOS-6 on the launch pad ===
On September 1, 2016, the 29th Falcon 9 rocket exploded on the launchpad while propellant was being loaded for a routine pre-launch static fire test. The payload, Israeli satellite AMOS-6, partly commissioned by Facebook, was destroyed with the launcher. On January 2, 2017, SpaceX released an official statement indicating that the cause of the failure was a buckled liner in several of the COPV tanks, causing perforations that allowed liquid and/or solid oxygen to accumulate underneath the COPVs carbon strands, which were subsequently ignited possibly due to friction of breaking strands.

=== Zuma launch ===
Zuma was a classified United States government satellite and was developed and built by Northrop Grumman at an estimated cost of US$3.5 billion. Its launch, originally planned for mid-November 2017, was postponed to January 8, 2018, as fairing tests for another SpaceX customer were assessed. Following a successful Falcon 9 launch, the first-stage booster landed at LZ-1. Unconfirmed reports suggested that the Zuma spacecraft was lost, with claims that either the payload failed following orbital release, or that the customer-provided adapter failed to release the satellite from the upper stage, while other claims argued that Zuma was in orbit and operating covertly. SpaceX's COO Gwynne Shotwell stated that their Falcon 9 "did everything correctly" and that "Information published that is contrary to this statement is categorically false". A preliminary report indicated that the payload adapter, modified by Northrop Grumman after purchasing it from a subcontractor, failed to separate the satellite from the second stage under the zero gravity conditions. Due to the classified nature of the mission, no further official information is expected.

=== Falcon Heavy test flight ===
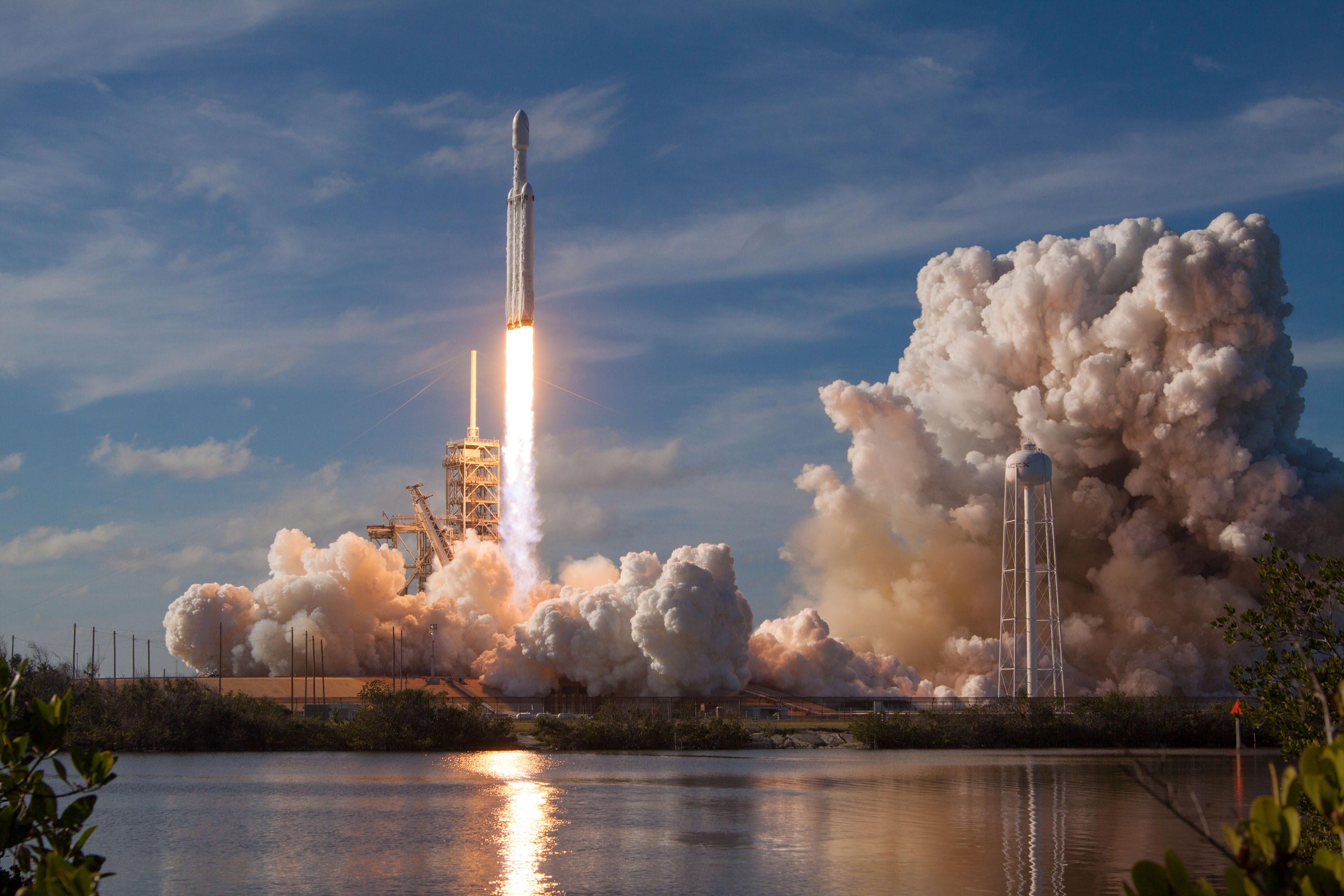
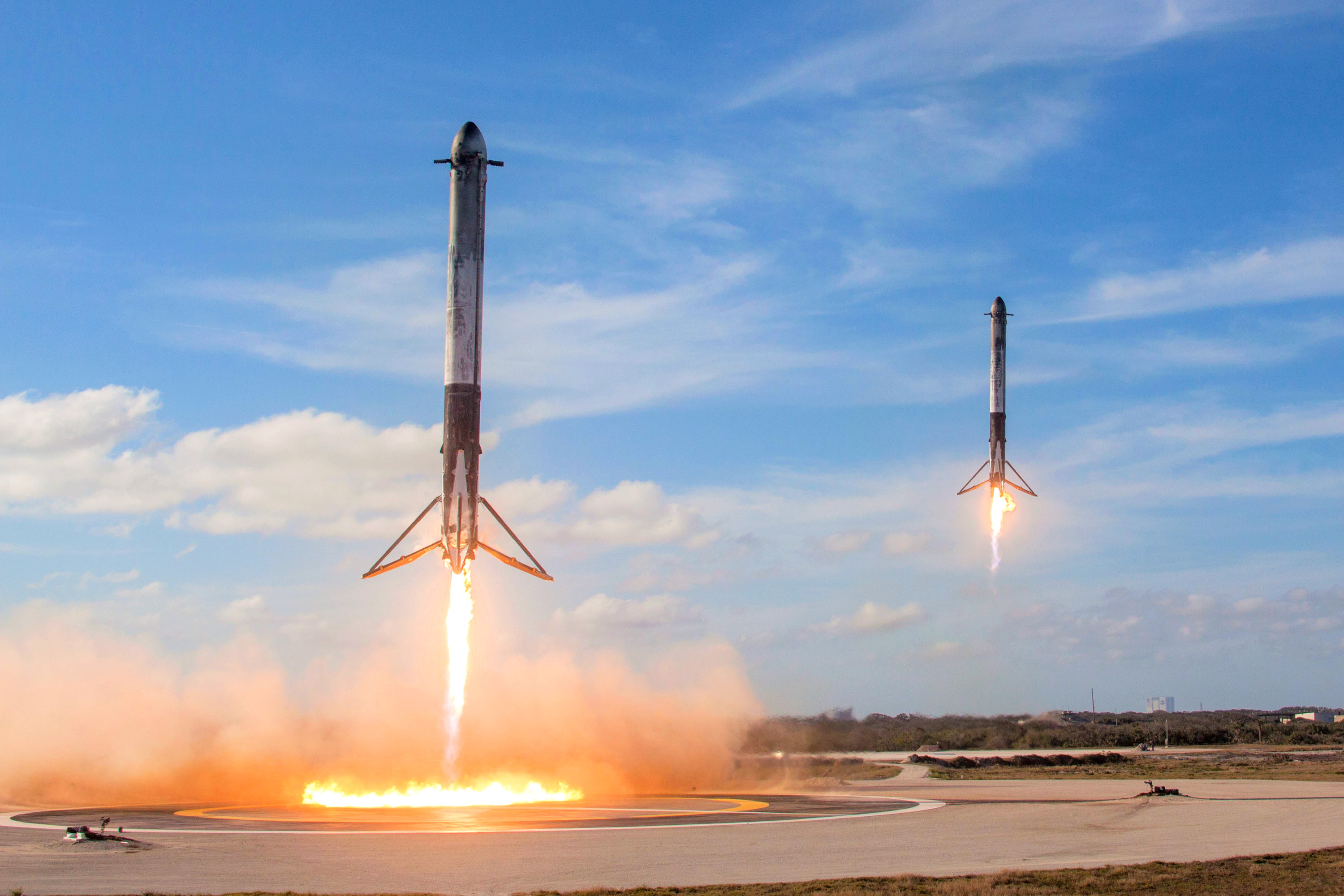
Liftoff of Falcon Heavy on its maiden flight (left) and its two side-boosters landing at LZ-1 and LZ-2 a few minutes later (right)

The maiden launch of the Falcon Heavy occurred on February 6, 2018, making it the most powerful rocket since the Saturn V, with a theoretical payload capacity to low Earth orbit more than double the Delta IV Heavy. Both side boosters landed nearly simultaneously after a ten-minute flight. The central core failed to land on a floating platform at sea. The rocket carried a car and a mannequin to an eccentric heliocentric orbit that reaches further than aphelion of Mars.

=== First crewed flights ===
On March 2, 2019, SpaceX launched its first orbital flight of Dragon 2 (Crew Dragon). It was an uncrewed mission to the International Space Station. The Dragon contained a mannequin named Ripley, which was equipped with multiple sensors to gather data about how a human would feel during the flight. Along with the mannequin was 300 pounds of cargo of food and other supplies. Also on board was Earth plush toy referred to as a "Super high tech zero-g indicator". The toy became a hit with astronaut Anne McClain, who showed the plushy on the ISS each day and also deciding to keep it on board to experience the crewed SpX-DM2.

The Dragon spent six days in space, including five days docked to the International Space Station. During the time, various systems were tested to make sure the vehicle was ready for US astronauts Doug Hurley and Bob Behnken to fly in it in 2020. The Dragon undocked and performed a re-entry burn before splashing down on March 8, 2019, at 08:45 EST, 320 km (200 mi) off the coast of Florida.

SpaceX held a successful launch of the first commercial orbital human space flight on May 30, 2020, crewed with NASA astronauts Doug Hurley and Bob Behnken. Both astronauts focused on conducting tests on the Crew Dragon capsule. Crew Dragon successfully returned to Earth, splashing down in the Gulf of Mexico on August 2, 2020.

=== Starlink 9-3 upper stage anomaly ===
On July 12, 2024, SpaceX launched a group of Starlink satellites from Vandenberg Space Force Base in California. While the booster performed nominally, including a successful droneship landing, the upper stage failed to relight for a second burn, with ice appearing to accumulate around the engine during the first burn due to a liquid oxygen leak that developed from vibrational fatigue which led to a crack in a pressure sensor line. The satellites were deployed from the upper stage into the lower initial parking orbit with a perigee of 135 km, less than half the targeted perigee. After separation, the satellites were commanded to burn their ion thrusters. SpaceX modified the satellite software so the thrusters would produce as much thrust as possible. Despite this, all of the satellites re-entered the atmosphere following the launch. This launch was the first Falcon 9 Block 5 or Falcon 9 Full Thrust failure thereby ending the Guinness World Record of 325 successful Falcon 9 launches since the pre-flight anomaly of AMOS-6.

=== Reuse of the rocket parts ===
SpaceX has developed a program to reuse the first-stage booster and its fairings or Dragon capsules, setting multiple booster and fairing or Dragon reflight records respectively. Only second-stages are expendable, reducing launch costs significantly.

== See also ==
- List of Falcon 1 launches
- List of Falcon 9 first-stage boosters
- List of SpaceX Dragon 1 missions
- List of SpaceX Dragon 2 missions
- List of Starlink and Starshield launches
- List of Starship launches
