= List of Artemis missions =

US deep space exploration programs

Emblem of the Artemis program

The Artemis program is a human spaceflight program by the United States. The Artemis program is intended to reestablish a human presence on the Moon for the first time since Apollo 17 in 1972; mid-term objectives include establishing an international expedition team, and a sustainable human presence on the Moon. Long-term objectives for Artemis are laying the foundations for the extraction of lunar resources, and eventually making crewed missions to Mars and beyond feasible.

To date, missions in the program are aimed at exploration of the Moon, including crewed and robotic exploration of the lunar surface. These explorations will be more focused toward areas such as the lunar poles and the far side of the moon. Five flights of the Orion Multi-Purpose Crew Vehicle are planned for launch in the Artemis program in the 2020s, with two having already taken place namely Artemis I and II. Before Artemis was named, the flights were referred to as "Orion missions". Numerous supporting scientific and technology demonstration missions are planned for launch under the program's Commercial Lunar Payload Services (CLPS).

== Missions ==
Mission and patch	Launch (UTC)	Crew	Lander	Duration	Outcome
Artemis I	November 16, 2022; 06:47:44	Uncrewed	None	25 days	Success
Artemis I	Maiden flight of the SLS, formerly "Exploration Mission 1" (EM1), carrying an uncrewed Orion capsule and ten CubeSats selected through several programs. The payloads were sent on a trans-lunar injection trajectory.				
Artemis II	April 1, 2026; 22:35:12	Reid Wiseman; Victor Glover; Christina Koch; Jeremy Hansen	None	9 days	Success
Artemis II	First crewed flight, carrying four crew members on a circumlunar free-return trajectory.				
Artemis III	Late 2027	Randy Bresnik; Luca Parmitano; Frank Rubio; Andre Douglas	Blue Moon and/or Starship	≈14 days	Planned
Artemis III	Crewed tests with Blue Moon and/or Starship prototypes in low Earth orbit.				
Artemis IV	Early 2028	TBA	Blue Moon or Starship HLS	≈30 days	Planned
Artemis IV	First lunar landing of the Artemis program.				
Artemis V	Late 2028	TBA	Blue Moon or Starship HLS	≈30 days	Planned
Artemis V	Second Artemis crewed lunar landing. Expected to see first efforts to begin building a permanent Moon base.				

== Support missions ==
=== Technology demonstrations ===
Launched on June 28, 2022, the Cislunar Autonomous Positioning System Technology Operations and Navigation Experiment ("CAPSTONE") mission is a small (25 kg) technology-demonstration spacecraft designed to test a low-energy trans-lunar trajectories and to demonstrate the near-rectilinear halo orbit (NRHO) intended to support lunar polar missions.

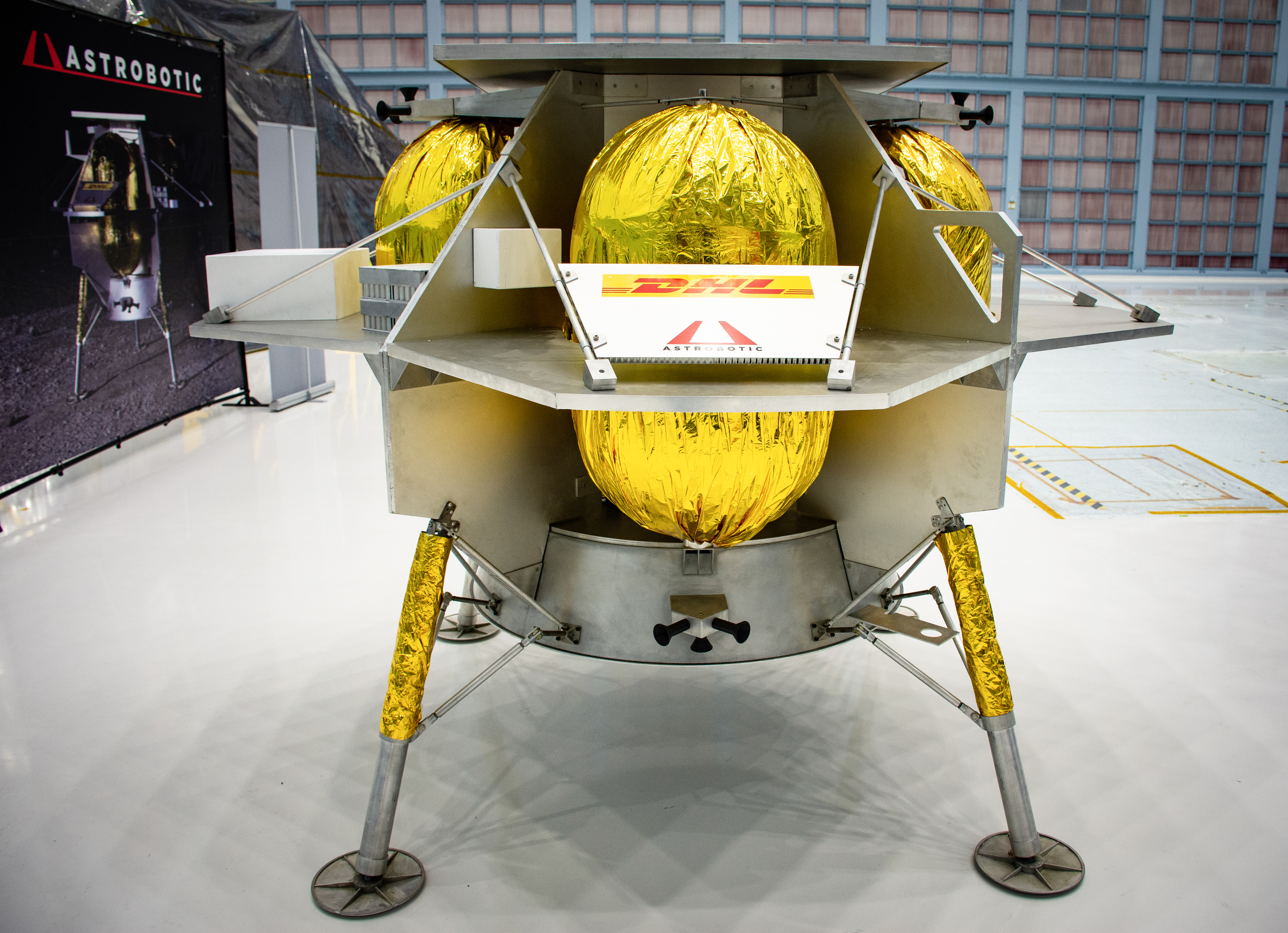
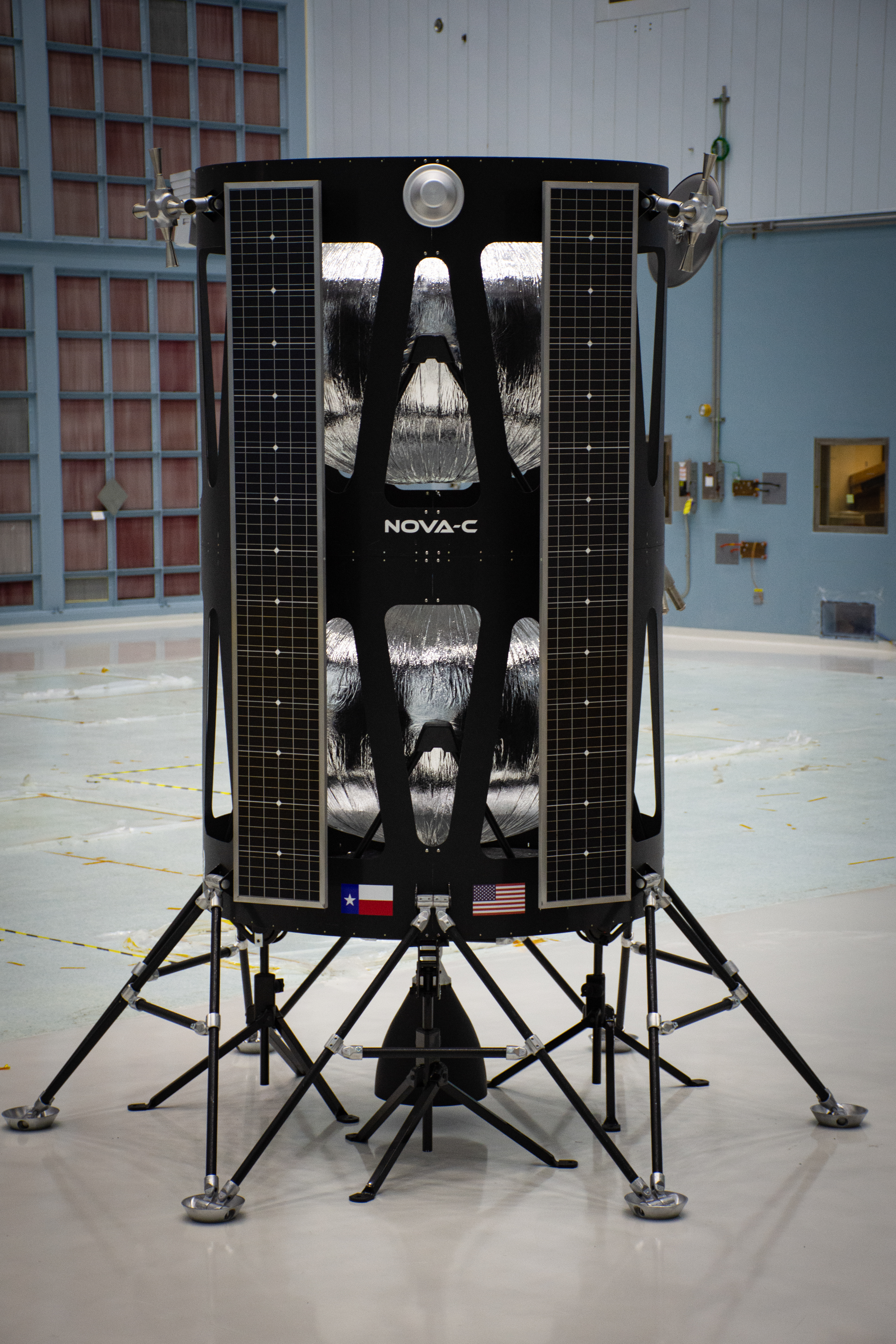
Peregrine (left) and Nova-C (right) will be the first two robotic landers to directly support the Artemis program.

=== Surface missions ===
The Commercial Lunar Payload Services (CLPS) program will support the Artemis program by landing several small payloads focused on scouting for lunar resources, in situ resource utilization (ISRU) experiments, and lunar science, in preparation for an extended human presence on the lunar surface.

List of CLPS missions
Mission	Launch date	Operator	Lander	Secondary spacecraft	Launch pad	Launch vehicle	Duration	References
Peregrine Mission One	January 8, 2024	Astrobotic	Peregrine	Iris; Colmena x 5	Cape Canaveral, SLC-41	Vulcan Centaur	10 days (failure)	
The lander carried multiple payloads, with a total payload mass capacity of 90 kg. However, the spacecraft was unable to reach the moon because of a propellant leak. It burned up over the Pacific Ocean on January 18.
IM-1	February 15, 2024	Intuitive Machines	Nova-C	Eaglecam	Kennedy Space Center, LC-39A	Falcon 9	7 days (partial failure)	
The lander carried six NASA-sponsored instruments, as well as six payloads from other customers, including EagleCAM. The Odysseus lander successfully touched down at Malapert A near the lunar south pole on February 22, 2024. The mission ended after 7 days with the onset of lunar night, after which no further signals from the spacecraft were received.
Blue Ghost M1	January 15, 2025	Firefly Aerospace	Blue Ghost		Kennedy Space Center, LC-39A	Falcon 9	13 days	
The Blue Ghost lander launched on January 15, 2025 on a SpaceX Falcon 9 rocket and successfully landed in the Mare Crisium on March 2, 2025, thus becoming only the second commercial mission to achieve a successful moon landing.
IM-2	February 27, 2025	Intuitive Machines	Nova-C	Micro-Nova Gracie; AstroAnt; MAPP LV1; Yaoki	Kennedy Space Center, LC-39A	Falcon 9	12 hours (Failure)	
The mission successfully launched on February 27, 2025 on a SpaceX Falcon 9 rocket and landed at lunar south pole in Mons Mouton on March 6, 2025. However, the lander tipped after touchdown, preventing any meaningful scientific experiments from being performed. On March 13, Intuitive Machines shared that, like on the IM-1 mission, the Athena's altimeter had failed during landing, leaving its onboard computer without an accurate altitude reading. As a result, the spacecraft struck a plateau, tipped over, and skidded across the lunar surface, rolling once or twice before settling inside the crater. The company's CEO compared it to a baseball player sliding into a base. During the slide, the spacecraft rolled once or twice, before coming to rest inside the crater. The impact also kicked up regolith that coated the solar panels in dust, further degrading their performance.
Blue Moon Pathfinder Mission 1	NET Q3 2026	Blue Origin	Blue Moon Mark 1		Cape Canaveral Launch Complex 36	New Glenn		
Griffin Mission One	July 2026	Astrobotic	Griffin		Kennedy Space Center, LC-39A	Falcon Heavy	≈100 Earth days	
Blue Moon Pathfinder Mission 2	Late 2027	Blue Origin	Blue Moon Mark 1		Cape Canaveral Launch Complex 36	New Glenn		
The lander will carry NASA's VIPER rover to the Moon.
ispace Mission 5	2030	ispace / Draper	ULTRA		TBA	TBA	≈9–10 Earth days	

== See also ==
- List of Apollo missions
- List of Constellation missions
- List of Space Shuttle missions
