= Intuitive Machines Nova-C =

Lunar lander developed by Intuitive Machines

Nova-C lunar lander
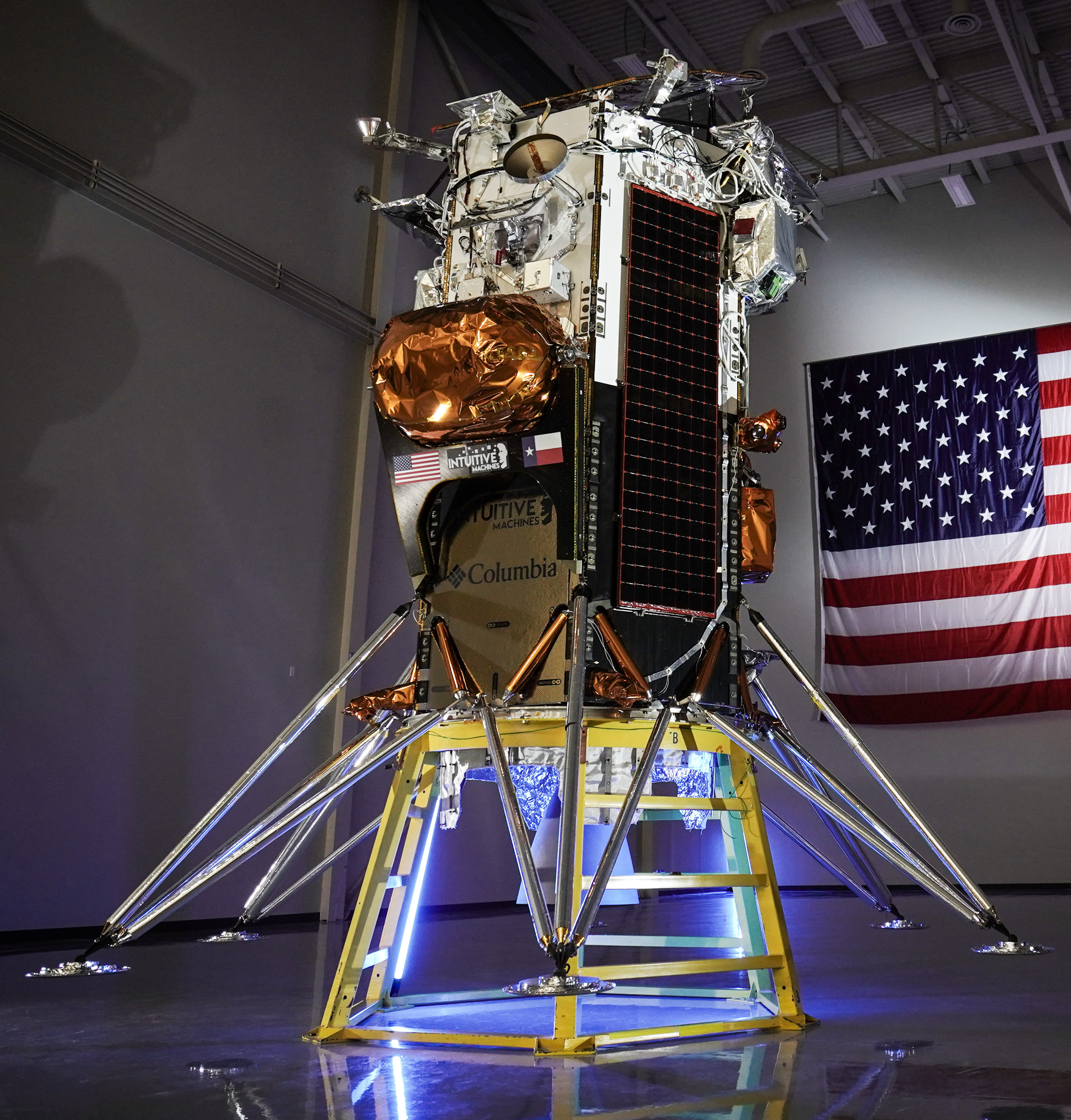
- Odysseus in preparation for launch
- Manufacturer: Intuitive Machines
- Designer: Intuitive Machines
- Country of origin: United States
- Operator: Intuitive Machines
- Applications: Lunar payload delivery and support

Specifications
- Spacecraft type: Lunar lander
- Bus: Nova-C bus
- Launch mass: 1,900 kg (4,200 lb)
- Payload capacity: 100 kg (220 lb)
- Power: 200 W (0.27 hp)
- Design life: 14 days after landing

Dimensions
- Length: 4.3 m (14 ft)
- Diameter: 1.6 m (5 ft 3 in)

Production
- Status: In production
- On order: 4
- Built: 2
- Launched: 2
- Retired: 2
- Maiden launch: 15 February 2024, 1:05 am EST (06:05 UTC)

Related spacecraft
- Derived from: Project Morpheus

- Additional flight information
Launch vehicle	Falcon 9 Block 5
Avg. cost per spacecraft	$118 million US
- Proximate missions
Last mission	IM-2
Last mission launch date	27 February 2025
Next mission	IM-3
Next mission launch date	Early 2027

The Intuitive Machines Nova-C, or simply Nova-C, is a class of lunar landers designed by Intuitive Machines (IM) to deliver small payloads to the lunar surface. It is the first spacecraft to use methalox propulsion to navigate between the Earth and the Moon.

The first Nova-C, named Odysseus, was launched for the IM-1 mission on 15 February 2024 and landed on the lunar surface on 22 February. This was the first American spacecraft to perform a soft landing on the Moon in over 50 years. Athena, the second Nova-C lander, was launched on 27 February 2025 for the IM-2 mission. It carried the Micro-Nova Gracie and other rovers and payloads. A third Nova-C named Trinity will conduct the IM-3 mission, scheduled for the first part of 2027. SpaceX is under contract to provide Falcon 9 launches for each of the three landers.

== Funding ==
In 2017, Space Policy Directive 1 signaled the intention of returning NASA astronauts to the Moon. NASA documents obtained by The New York Times suggested the agency would involve the private spaceflight sector in the effort. In 2018, NASA solicited bids from nine companies, including Intuitive Machines, for the Commercial Lunar Payload Services (CLPS) program. Intuitive Machines was one of three service providers awarded task orders in 2019 for delivery of NASA science payloads to the Moon. CLPS is part of the NASA Artemis program; one of the long term goals of Artemis is establishing a permanent crewed base on the Moon. Intuitive Machines was one of three service providers awarded task orders in 2019 for delivery of NASA science payloads to the Moon.

In 2021, Intuitive Machines received a NASA contract that was initially valued at US$77 million to conduct lunar landings for NASA. After contract modifications, the total contract value came to US$118 million in 2024.

== Overview ==
=== Structure ===
The lander structure is a hexagonal cylinder with six landing legs and is 4.3 m (14 ft) tall by 1.57 m (5 ft 2 in) wide. It has a launch mass of 1,908 kg (4,206 lb), and a dry mass of 675 kg (1,488 lb) and can hold a payload of over 130 kg (290 lb).

=== Propulsion ===
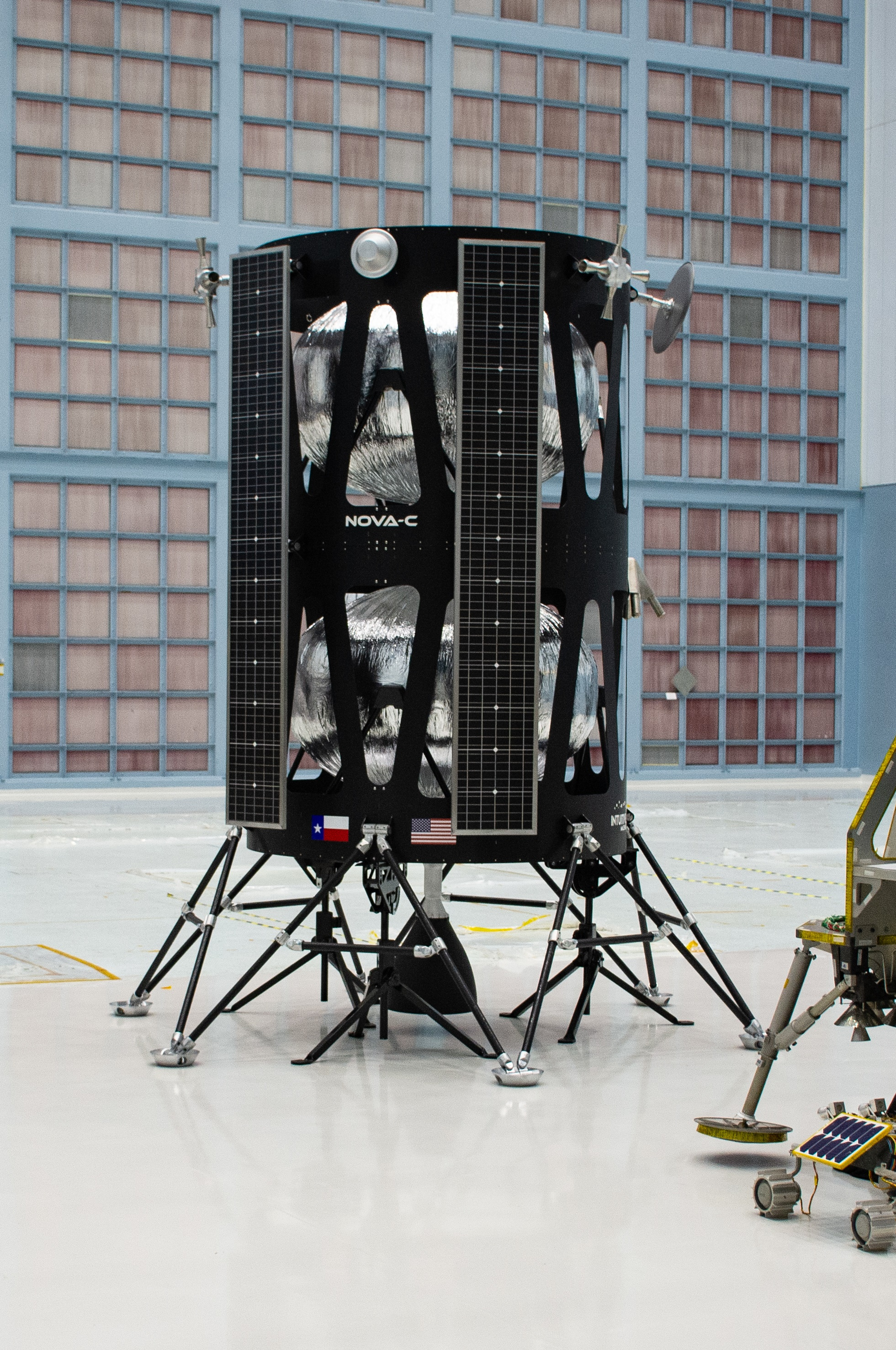
Nova-C Class lander model on display

Nova-C was developed by Intuitive Machines, inheriting technology from NASA's Project Morpheus. Its gimbaled VR900 main engine uses methane and oxygen as liquid propellants. Pressurized by helium gas, the engine produces 3,100 N (700 lb_{f}) of thrust. For attitude (Note: attitude here refers to orientation of the spacecraft) control the vehicle uses a helium reaction control system (RCS). Each thruster in the RCS produces 4.45 N (1 lbf) of thrust. At launch Nova-C is filled with 845 kg (1,863 lb) of liquid oxygen, 422 kg (930 lb) kg of liquid methane and 17 kg (37 lb) of gaseous helium.

Propellant is loaded onto Nova-C at the launch pad alongside propellant loading of the launch vehicle. Use of liquid methane and liquid oxygen is believed to be an enabling technology for future deep space missions. Propellants aboard the lander are stored in composite over-wrap liner-less cryogenic tanks. Thermodynamic venting systems provide cryogenic cooling.

=== Electric power ===
Nova-C landers use solar panels as a source of electrical power. Most areas of the lunar surface are sunlit during lunar days, which last approximately fourteen Earth days.

Electrical power is generated by a photovoltaic system with three solar panels, a top deck panel and two body panels, generating a combined maximum of 200 W on the lunar surface. A 25 amp-hour battery supplies power to a 28 VDC bus for use by the spacecraft when power generation lags consumption.

=== Communications ===
Nova-C is capable of 24/7 data coverage for its client payloads

=== Landing ===
The lander is designed to stay upright when landing on a slope of up to 10 degrees. The lander includes autonomous landing and hazard detection technology and once landed is still capable of relocating itself to a second landing site by performing a vertical takeoff, cruise, and vertical landing.

== Missions ==
Intuitive Machines is conducting the first three Nova-C missions for the NASA Commercial Lunar Payload Services program. The landers are tasked with delivering small science and technology-development payloads.

=== IM-1 (Odysseus) ===
The lander for the first Nova-C mission, IM-1, was named Odysseus. A contract for the mission was signed in 2021, with later modifications. The mission launched 15 February 2024 on a Falcon 9 launch vehicle. It landed with a "rough" – soft landing on 22 February 2024 in the South Pole region of the moon, approximately at 80.13° South latitude and 1.44° East longitude, inside a shallow 1 km diameter crater with a 12° slope. The lander came to rest about 1.5 km away from the intended landing site near the Malapert A crater. The line of approach brought Odysseus in from the northeast over Schomberger crater.

Upon initial contact with the lunar surface, the lander broke a leg off of the hexagonal body, and bounced back along the line of approach, with the main engine and RCS firing to null out vertical and lateral velocities. After landing vertically, the lander slowly settled onto the lunar surface with the top solar array pointed in the general direction of Schomberger crater. One of the rectangular arrays, originally intended to be vertical, is on top and angled 30° with the horizontal, or about 18° with the lunar surface. IM announced that until entering standby mode on February 29, 2024, Odysseus had transmitted over 350 megabytes of science and engineering data from all payloads, and it will try to revive Odysseus during the next lunar day.

Odysseus's "rough" – soft Moon landing is the first soft landing of any kind for an American made spacecraft since Apollo 17, more than 50 years ago, and the first by a private company. The soft Odysseus landing also qualifies the Odysseus mission as the first liquid methane and liquid oxygen (methalox) powered spacecraft to fire beyond low earth orbit, as well as the first methalox spacecraft to land on an off-world celestial body.

After the landing Odysseus was resting on the surface at a 30° angle with the horizontal. It has been confirmed by Tim Crain, CTO of Intuitive Machines, that one of the landing leg struts broke off during the landing, and that the lander is resting on a helium tank and/or a computer shelf that was strapped outside of the main fuselage. Based on telemetry received by mission controllers Odysseus appeared in "good health." The antennas were not vertically aligned as initially planned, and transmissions from the lander were somewhat reduced. Both science and engineering data were received from the lander. It was hoped that a data link could be restored with Odysseus after lunar sunrise occurs at Malapert A crater, although this was not a requirement of the mission, On March 23 Intuitive Machines announced that Odysseus would not wake up and that the mission had ended.

Odysseus touched down on the Moon in the middle of a lunar day, and was expected to remain functional for approximately six Earth days (until February 27), when the cold lunar night will set in and the solar panels will no longer be able to supply power. IM engineers announced that they may be able to maintain communication with Odysseus for an additional 10 to 20 hours after the sun has gone down over the Odysseus landing site, due to Odysseus's battery capacity. It was also announced that the Odysseus data feed back to Earth has been sending back payload related science data as well as images.

IM and NASA held a joint press conference on February 28 to discuss and review the IM-1 mission.

=== IM-2 (Athena) ===
Intuitive Machines was selected in October 2020 in order to land its second Nova-C lander near the lunar south pole. In May 2024, the company shared IM-2 entered into its final assembly stage. The primary payload, PRIME-1, includes the TRIDENT ice drill to sample ice from below the lunar surface and the MSolo mass spectrometer to measure the amount of ice in the samples.

ILO-1 prime contractor Canadensys was working to deliver "a flight-ready low-cost optical payload for the ILO-1 mission, ruggedized for the Moon South Pole environment". It could potentially be ready for integration on the IM-2 mission.

The μNova (Micro-Nova) Hopper was to separate from the Nova-C lander after landing and function as a standalone hopper lander, exploring multiple difficult-to-reach areas such as deep craters on the lunar surface.

The MiniPIX TPX3 SPACE payload, provided by the Czech company ADVACAM, will be onboard the Nova-C lunar lander. This payload is designed to monitor the radiation field on the Moon and help understand how to protect crew and equipment from the negative effects of cosmic rays. This marks the first Czech payload planned to be delivered to the Moon's surface.

Space technology company Lunar Outpost sent their first lunar rover, the Mobile Autonomous Prospecting Platform (MAPP), on this mission in a partnership with Nokia Bell Labs and Intuitive Machines. MAPP was to collect lunar samples for NASA under a contract worth just $1, symbolic of a new incentive for the commercial space industry to access resources in space. Photos of the samples and other data were to be transmitted through radio equipment and antennas to communicate with the Nova-C lander.

A collaboration to demonstrate 4G cellular connectivity, in partnership with Nokia Bell Labs and NASA will be aboard the lander. Nokia's equipment is a Network-In-a-Box and was to connect the Nova-C lander with Lunar Outpost's MAPP rover and IM's Micro-Nova Hopper. This 4G/LTE network will provide more bandwidth than the more conventional ultra high frequency (UHF) systems used for space communication. Nokia says they hope that future missions will use shared infrastructure to interlink bases on the lunar surface.

IM-2 Athena was launched on 27 February 2025. The Athena lander fell on its side when landing on 6 March 2025, but its instruments remained partially functional (albeit with a reduced downlink capacity) for a few hours before power ran out, so the mission was judged a partial failure. On March 13, Intuitive Machines shared that, like on the IM-1 mission, the Athena's altimeter had failed during landing, leaving its onboard computer without an accurate altitude reading. As a result, the spacecraft struck a plateau, tipped over, and skidded across the lunar surface, rolling once or twice before settling inside the crater. The company's CEO compared it to a baseball player sliding into a base. The impact also kicked up regolith that coated the solar panels in dust, further degrading their performance.

=== IM-3 (Trinity) ===
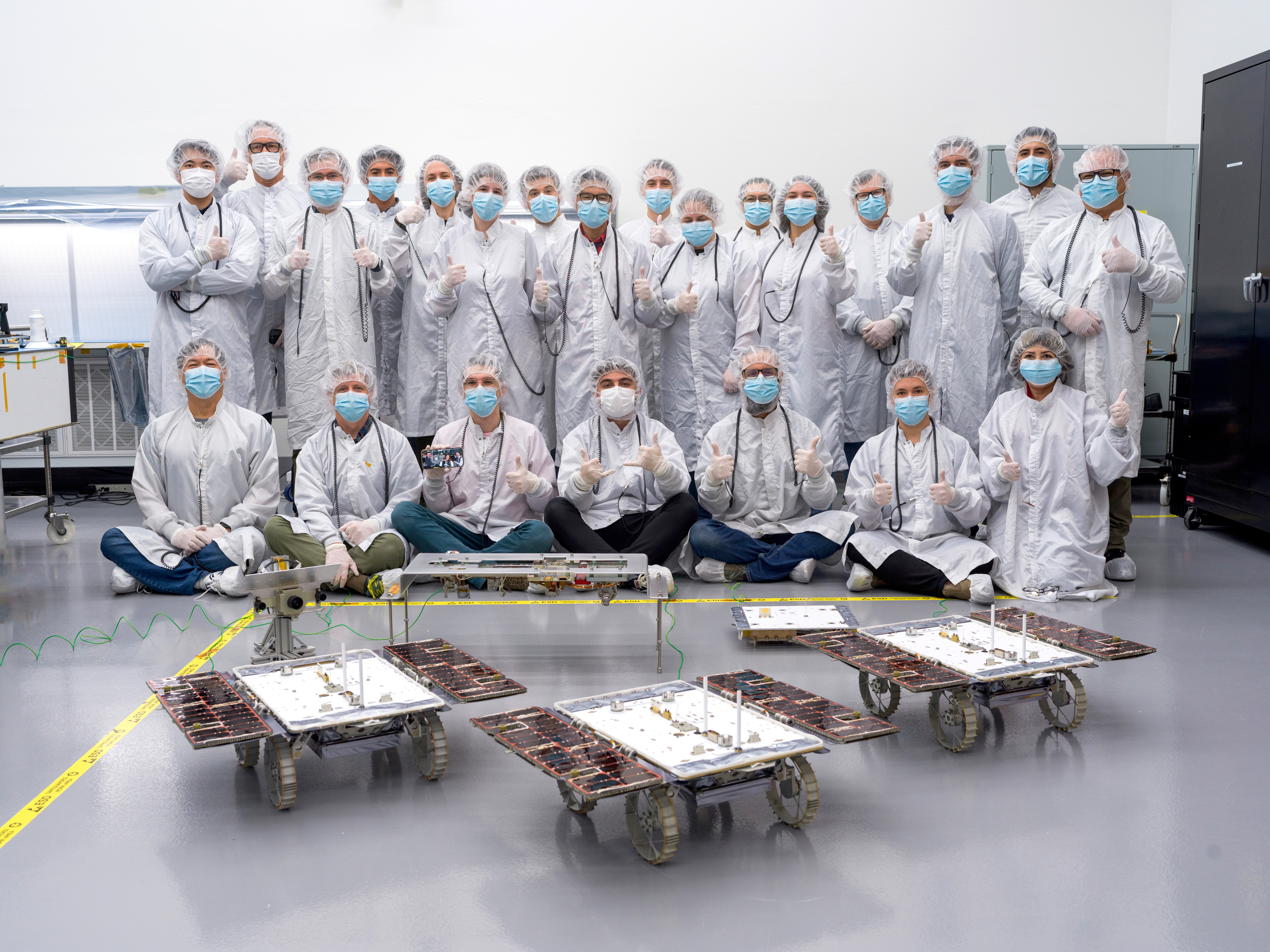
The CADRE ATLO Team presents completed rovers

NASA selected a Nova-C mission for CLPS task order CP-11. It will deliver payloads to the lunar swirl in the Reiner Gamma region. In August 2021, Intuitive Machines selected SpaceX to launch its third lunar mission, IM-3. In August 2024 the launch of IM-3 was expected to take place no earlier than October 2025. In an investor update on August 7, 2025, IM announced the IM-3 mission was targeting the second half of 2026. The lander will conduct experiments investigating the properties of the unexpected magnetic field that has been detected in the vicinity of the Reiner Gamma swirl.

The Reiner Gamma landing site was announced for the first PRISM opportunity and the JHU Applied Physics Laboratory's Lunar Vertex payload was selected to conducted a detailed scientific analysis of the surface and surface environment. David Blewett (APL) is the principal investigator and leads the science team. Lunar Vertex includes payload elements on the Nova-C lander (APL magnetometer, SwRI plasma spectrometer, and Redwire camera arrays) and on a Lunar Outpost rover (APL magnetometer and Canadensys microscopic imager). APL also provided overall management, systems engineer, SMA, and rover integration and testing.

Additional IM-3 payloads include the Cooperative Autonomous Distributed Robotic Explorers (CADRE) rovers, ESA's MoonLIGHT Pointing Actuator (MPAc) and KASI's Lunar Space Environment Monitor (LUSEM).

In December 2025, ASA funded organisation Lunaria One was approved to add the Australian Lunar Experiment Promoting Horticulture (ALEPH-1) payload which will test plant growth and survival in the lunar environment.

The lander for the mission has reportedly been named, Trinity.

=== IM-4 ===
IM-4 was announced and awarded by NASA in September 2024 for a launch in 2027. The mission will carry PROSPECT, an ESA drilling experiment designed to search for volatiles under the lunar surface. After landing, the Nova-C lander will drop a ball-shaped probe to the lunar surface for JAXA's RISE regolith experiment.

=== IM-C1 ===
Intuitive Machines have indicated that they are working on a 'commercial' mission, named IM-C1.

== Further Nova-C missions ==
The Nova-C lander was designed to be compatible with methane and oxygen fuel sources that are believed to be available on both the Moon and on Mars. For future missions, methane and oxygen could potentially be "harvested" wherever the Nova-C lander may be based using In-situ resource utilization (ISRU) (off-world resource processing technologies). The Nova-C lander technology platform can be scaled up to mid and large lander classes, capable of accommodating larger payloads.

== Successors ==
=== Nova-D ===
Early reports of the Nova-D indicated it would use two VR-900 engines and be capable of carrying more than 500 kg to the lunar surface. In 2021 Northrop Grumman announced that the Lunar Terrain Vehicle they were designing would be delivered by a Nova-D lander. In an interview with NASA recorded in October 2023, Tim Crain, CTO of Intuitive Machines, described the development of the Nova-D.

In August 2024, Intuitive Machines proposed a mission to deliver NASA's VIPER rover to the Moon on a Nova-D lander no earlier than late 2027. The VIPER delivery mission was later awarded to Blue Origin.

In March 2026, NASA awarded IM a fifth CLPS task order designated CT-4 to deliver science and technology payloads to a location near Malapert crater, close to the lunar south pole. IM has indicated this will require a Nova-D lander. The IM-5 mission is scheduled for launch in 2030, and will carry a lunar rover from ASA (Roo-ver) and Honeybee Robotics each integrated with a NASA payload, as well as five additional payloads from NASA, KASI, and Grapevine Productions.

=== Nova-M ===
Intuitive Machines is developing another lander, the Nova-M which, according to early reports, will use two VR-3500 engines originally developed for Boeing and their HLS to carry 5,000 kg to the lunar surface.

== See also ==
Other commercial lunar lander programs

- Blue Ghost (Firefly)
- Blue Moon (Blue Origin)
- SERIES-2 (Draper)
- Peregrine (Astrobotic)
- Starship HLS (SpaceX)
- Hakuto-R Mission 1 (ispace)

Lunar lander programs by country

- China: Chinese Lunar Exploration Program
- India: Chandrayaan Programme
- Russia: Luna-Glob
- United States: Commercial Lunar Payload Services (Artemis program)
- Japan: Japanese Lunar Exploration Program
