= Internet in a Box (disambiguation) =

Internet-in-a-Box is a low-cost digital library, consisting of a wireless access point with storage, which users nearby can connect to.

Internet in a Box may also refer to:

- IBox, an Internet connection software packages
- Internet in a Suitcase, an open-source wireless mesh network for electronic communication

== See also ==
- Network-In-a-Box
