= Rashid 2 =

United Arab Emirates lunar rover mission

- Operator: (United Arab Emirates) MBRSC

Spacecraft properties
- Spacecraft type: Lunar rover

Start of mission
- Launch date: 2027 (planned)
- Emirates Planetary Programme Emirates Lunar Mission

Rashid 2 is a lunar rover developed by the Mohammed bin Rashid Space Centre (MBRSC) as the second rover of the Emirates Lunar Mission program. It is planned to be delivered to the far side of the Moon in 2027 aboard Blue Ghost Mission 2.

== Instruments ==
=== PLATE ===
The Pilot Lunar Abrasion Technical Experiment (PLATE), developed by the European Space Agency (ESA), consists of aluminum plates attached to the wheels of the rover, designed to record detrimental scratches and dents caused by the lunar environment during the rover's operations. This materials experiment is expected to provide insights for improving design of future planetary rovers.

=== RTx ===
The RTx ground-penetrating radar transmitter, developed by NASA, is designed to transmit signals that can probe up to 100 metres below the lunar surface. The signals will be received by the LuSEE-Night instrument on the lander.

== History ==
In September 2026, MBRSC completed the integration of the RTx transmitter onto Rashid 2.

== See also ==
- Commercial Lunar Payload Services – NASA program contracting commercial transportation services to the Moon
- Terrae Novae – European programme for human spaceflight and robotic space exploration
