= Astrobotic Peregrine =

Peregrine lunar lander
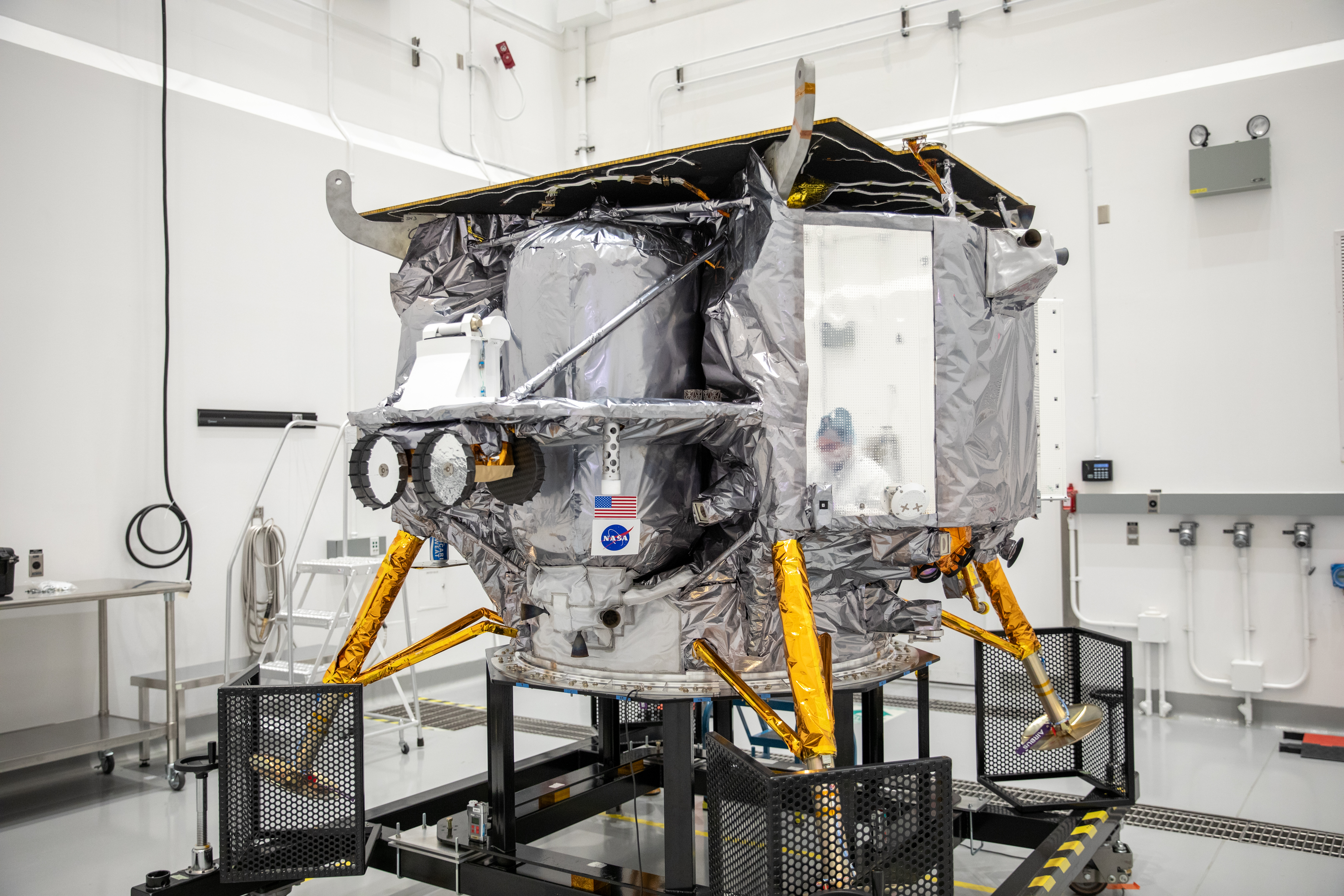
- Peregrine Mission One prior to launch
- Manufacturer: Astrobotic Technology
- Designer: Astrobotic
- Country of origin: United States
- Operator: Astrobotic
- Applications: Lunar payload delivery and support

Specifications
- Spacecraft type: Lunar lander
- Payload capacity: 100 kg (220 lb)

Production
- Status: In production
- On order: 2
- Built: 1
- Launched: 1
- Failed: 1

The Astrobotic Peregrine robotic spacecraft are a class of lunar landers designed and operated by Astrobotic Technology to deliver small payloads to the surface of the Moon. NASA has awarded three Commercial Lunar Payload Services (CLPS) task orders to Astrobotic for Peregrine-class missions. The first mission, Peregrine Mission One, launched in January, 2024. That mission experienced a propellant leak shortly after the lander was deployed into orbit, and did not reach the Moon. The other two Peregrine task orders were awarded to Astrobotic in June, 2026.

== Funding ==
In November, 2018 NASA announced that nine companies, including Astrobotic, were eligible for CLPS task orders. In May, 2019 Astrobotic was awarded CLPS Task Order 2-AB, initially valued at $79.5 million. The two missions assigned to Peregrine in June, 2026 were reported as being a combined $297.9 million award.

== Design ==
The Peregrine lander is approximately 2.5 m (8 ft 2 in) wide and 1.9 m (6 ft 3 in) tall. Astrobotic asserts a Peregrine lander can deliver 100 kg (220 lb) to the lunar surface at a polar landing site.

=== Structure ===
The Peregrine mechanical structure is made of aluminum alloy, and includes four landing legs.

=== Propulsion ===
Peregrine has five pressure-fed hypergolic main engines and twelve RCS thrusters. Propellant is contained in four tanks (two each for fuel and oxidizer) with a fifth tank for high-pressure helium.

=== Electrical power ===
Electrical power provided by solar cells is stored in a lithium-ion battery. Solar panel configurations differ among landers, depending on the intended landing site.

=== Communication ===
The lander communicates with Earth ground stations using X-Band radio frequencies. The design includes multiple low gain antennas for use during cruise and lunar orbit operations and a higher gain antenna to communicate from the lunar surface.

== Missions ==
=== Peregrine Mission One ===
Peregrine Lunar Lander flight 01, commonly referred to as Peregrine Mission One, was a failed American lunar lander mission. The lander, dubbed Peregrine, was built by Astrobotic Technology and carried payloads for the NASA Commercial Lunar Payload Services (CLPS) program. Peregrine Mission One launched on January 8, 2024, at 2:18 am EST, on the maiden flight of the Vulcan Centaur (Vulcan) rocket. The goal was to land the first U.S.-built lunar lander on the Moon since the crewed Apollo Lunar Module on Apollo 17 in 1972.

The lander carried multiple payloads, with a payload capacity of 90 kg. Shortly after the lander separated from the Vulcan rocket in lunar injection orbit, a propellant leak developed that prevented the lander from completing its mission. After six days in orbit, the spacecraft was redirected into Earth's atmosphere, where it burned up in Earth's atmosphere over the South Pacific Ocean on January 18, 2024.
