= Roo-ver (lunar rover) =

Planned ASA lunar rover

- Roo-ver prototype at the Australian Space Discovery Centre
- Mission type: Exploration, resource prospecting
- Operator: NASA, ASA
- Website: https://roover.com.au
- Mission duration: 14 days (planned)

Spacecraft properties
- Spacecraft type: Semi autonomous lunar rover
- Bus: Intuitive Machines Nova-D lander
- Manufacturer: ELO_{2} (rover)

Start of mission
- Launch date: 2030 (planned)
- Contractor: NASA

Moon lander
- Landing site: Mons Malapert, lunar south pole region

Payload
- Multifunctional Nanosensor Platform (MNP)

Roo-ver is Australia's first lunar rover funded by the Australian Space Agency (ASA) and is being built by industry consortium ELO_{2}. It is scheduled for launch to the Moon’s south pole region aboard Intuitive Machines Nova-D lander in 2030.

== Background ==
As part of the Australian Government's Moon To Mars initiative, the ASA signed an agreement with NASA in 2021 in support of NASA's Artemis program. The agreement included the development of a small lunar rover to carry NASA's in-situ resource utilization (ISRU) system which will collect regolith from the lunar surface and detect elements within the soil.

A nation-wide competition was held by the ASA in 2023 to name the lunar rover. Around 8,000 names were submitted and nearly 20,000 votes were registered. The winning name submitted by New South Wales resident Siwa with 35% of the total votes was Roo-ver, which voters felt best reflected the Australian spirit. The other names shortlisted were Kakirra with 26% of the vote, Coolamon with 25% of the vote, and Mateship with 13% of the vote.

== Development ==
The ASA announced in March 2025 that a consortium of Australian businesses and companies known as the EPE + Lunar Outpost Oceania Consortium (ELO_{2}) had been awarded the contract to build Roo-ver. The consortium is co-led by EPE Oceania and Lunar Outpost Oceania and includes 18 other organisations such as BHP, RMIT Space Industry Hub, Melbourne Space Laboratory, Adelaide University, Inovor Technologies, Element Robotics, Victorian Space Science Education Centre (VSSEC), and Edith Cowan University.

The latest prototype of Roo-ver underwent two weeks of testing in late August 2026 at Adelaide University’s Extra Terrestrial Environment Simulation (EXTERRES) Covered Regolith Analogue for Testing and Experimental Research (CRATER) facility using realistic lunar environments to test the rover’s capabilities. NASA engineers also attended to test the capabilities of the Multifunctional Nanosensor Platform (MNP), the ISRU system that the rover will carry.

== Specifications ==
Roo-ver will be approximately the size of an airport carry-on suitcase and weigh around 20 kg (approx. 44 lbs) on Earth, and both sides will be lined with vertical solar panels. It will also be equipped with a compact thermal management system which was developed by the University of Melbourne’s Melbourne Space Laboratory (MSL) and successfully tested aboard the Australian built SpIRIT satellite. RMIT’s Advanced Manufacturing Precinct was used to prototype wheel designs which were then 3D printed in titanium, while Inovor Technologies built the electrical power system prototype.

== Mission ==
In August 2025, it was confirmed that Roo-ver would be assigned to NASA’s Commercial Lunar Payload Services’ (CLPS) CT-4 delivery mission. It was further revealed in March 2026 that CT-4 was awarded to Intuitive Machines. Designated the IM-5 mission, the Nova-D class lander will carry Roo-ver, as well as several other payloads, to Malapert Crater in the lunar south pole region in 2030. Roo-ver is planned to operate on the lunar surface for 14 Earth days, taking regolith samples and using the MNP instrument to measure the levels of exhaust plumes in the lunar environment.

=== Payload ===
The Multifunctional Nanosensor Platform (MNP) was developed by NASA's Goddard Space Flight Centre and showcased at the Lunar Surface Science Workshop in 2024. It features highly sensitive graphene and graphene oxide sensors which can detect single molecules of water, hydrogen and hydrocarbons in the soil. While Roo-ver drives around the lunar surface collecting the regolith samples, the MNP plans to measure exhaust plumes in those samples as a measure of time and distance from the lander which should provide a better understanding of the impacts of lander-generated volatiles on the lunar environment.

== See also ==
- List of missions to the Moon
