= Blue Moon Pathfinder Mission 2 =

Planned Blue Origin robotic lunar mission

- Names: CS-7
- Mission type: Lunar landing
- Operator: Blue Origin

Spacecraft properties
- Spacecraft: Blue Moon Mark 1 (MK1-SN001)

Start of mission
- Launch date: NET Late 2027
- Rocket: New Glenn
- Launch site: Cape Canaveral, LC‑36

Blue Moon Pathfinder Mission 2 is a planned robotic lunar landing mission developed by Blue Origin as part of NASA's Commercial Lunar Payload Services (CLPS) program. The mission is planned on being the first Blue Origin lunar landing mission available to deliver payloads for customers besides NASA. The mission is targeting a launch and landing in late 2027.

== Overview ==
Pathfinder Mission 2 is the planned second flight of the Blue Origin's Blue Moon Mark 1 lunar lander. Its first mission, The Pathfinder Mission, is a demonstration mission that will test out critical systems of the spacecraft. Both missions are a part of NASA's CLPS Program, and are contracted to deliver NASA payloads. Mission 2 has a total potential value of $190 million. To reach this full value, Blue Origin has to design, and demonstrate specific payload accommodations for NASA's VIPER rover.

=== Payloads ===
As of November 2025, Pathfinder mission 2 is only known to be carrying VIPER. Unlike Pathfinder Mission 1, Mission 2 is planned on being available for contracting to carry payloads from other space agencies and companies.

- VIPER (Volatiles Investigating Polar Exploration Rover): A 430 kg (950 lb) lunar rover developed by the NASA Ames Research Center that is designed to search for and determine the composition of lunar ice in preparation of planned crewed lunar landings as a part of the Artemis program.
