= McCandless Lunar Lander =

Proposed robotic lunar lander

- Manufacturer: Lockheed Martin
- Designer: Lockheed Martin
- Country of origin: United States
- Operator: Lockheed Martin
- Applications: Commercial cargo lander

Specifications
- Spacecraft type: Robotic lunar lander
- Payload capacity: 250 kg (550 lb)
- Power: 400 W from a single solar array on a boom
- Design life: 1 lunar day (14 Earth days)

Dimensions
- Length: Height: >2 m (6 ft 7 in)
- Diameter: 3 m (9.8 ft)

Production
- Status: Designed
- On order: 0
- Built: 0

Related spacecraft
- Derived from: Phoenix and InSight landers

McCandless Lunar Lander, also known as the McCandless Lunar Delivery Service, is a concept for a robotic lunar lander proposed as one of the commercial cargo vehicles for NASA's Commercial Lunar Payload Services (CLPS). The lander was proposed to NASA for funding by the aerospace company Lockheed Martin, and it is based on the successful Mars landers Phoenix and InSight.

== Overview ==
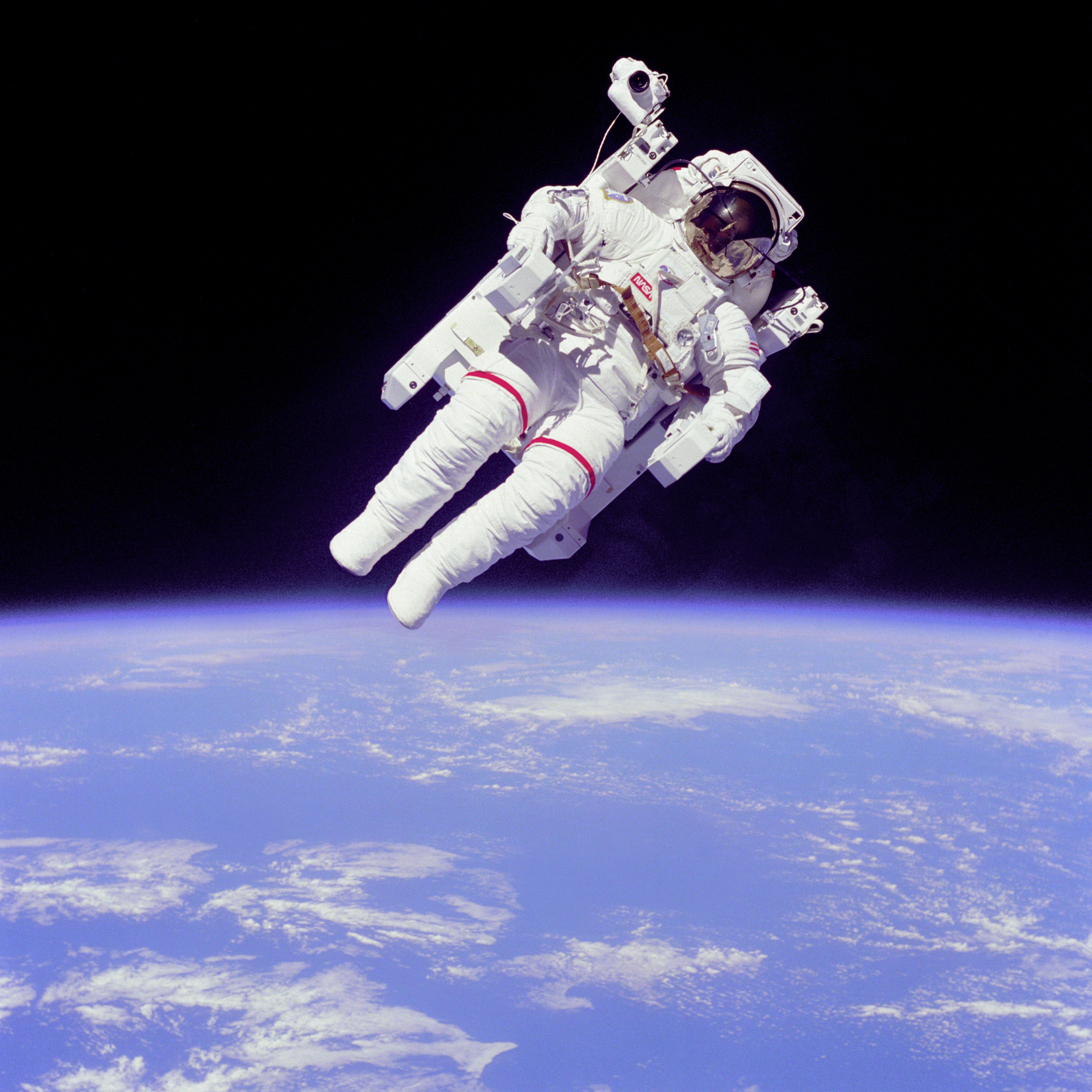
The lander is named in honor of Bruce McCandless II (1937–2017), who first used the company's MMU jetpack during STS-41-B in 1984

On 29 November 2018, NASA announced the first nine companies, including Lockheed Martin, that are allowed to bid on contracts by the Commercial Lunar Payload Services (CLPS). These contracts are indefinite delivery, indefinite quantity contracts with a combined maximum contract value of $2.6 billion during the next 10 years. The contracted landers will transport commercial payloads focused on exploration, in situ resource utilization (ISRU), and lunar science.

The McCandless lander is named in honor of the late astronaut and former Lockheed Martin employee Bruce McCandless II, who in 1984 performed the first free-flying spacewalk without a lifeline to the orbiting Space Shuttle, using a jetpack built by the company.

== Spacecraft ==
The McCandless lander design is based on the successful Phoenix and InSight Mars landers, designed and built by Lockheed Martin for NASA. The lander is being proposed to the new Commercial Lunar Payload Services program (CLPS) to deliver to the lunar surface up to 250 kg (550 lb) of usable payload, including stationary scientific instruments, small deployable rovers, ISRU experiments, or even sample-return vehicles.

The lander's system incorporates on-board radars and a set of rocket thrusters for deceleration and soft-landing. It will not need the aeroshell and heat shield, as the Moon has no atmosphere. The lander is presently designed to operate for one lunar day (14 Earth days), but upgrades for enduring the lunar nights can be considered depending on mission requirements.
