= John P. Thornton =

American executive (born 1984)

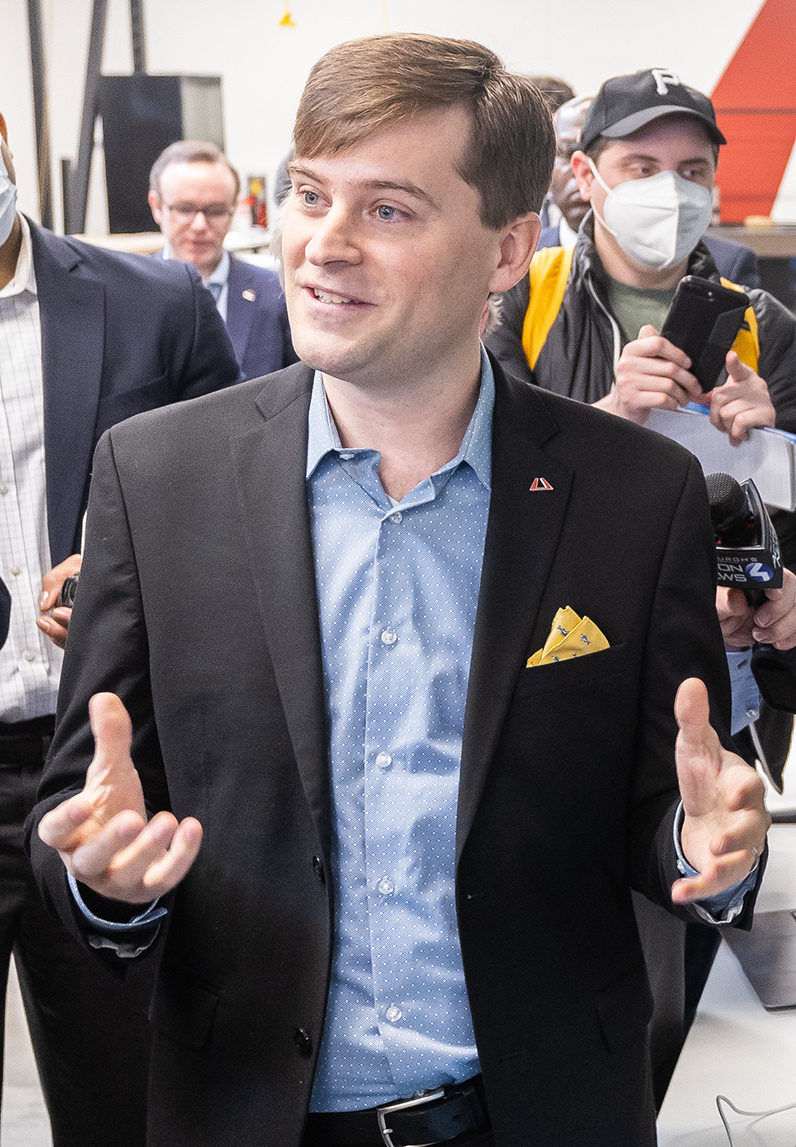
- Thornton in 2022
- Born: June 15, 1984 (age 42); Califon, New Jersey, U.S.
- Education: Carnegie Mellon University (BS, MS)
- Occupation: Business executive
- Title: CEO of Astrobotic Technology Inc. (2013-)

John Patrick Thornton (born June 15, 1984) is an American business executive. He is CEO of Astrobotic Technology Inc. which develops technology for lunar and planetary exploration.

== Career ==
Following graduation from Carnegie Mellon University, John was recruited to Astrobotic Technology Inc. by founder Red Whittaker and was promoted to CEO soon after. Under John's tenure Astrobotic Technology Inc secured several contracts from NASA including a $79.5 million contract to deliver payloads to the moon.

In 2019, he was named CEO of the Year by the Pittsburgh Tech Council.

== Personal life ==
John grew up in Califon, New Jersey where he was a boy scout earning the rank of Eagle Scout and attended Voorhees High School where he was on the varsity fencing squad. In 2015, John married Justine Kasznica Thornton. They live in Pittsburgh, Pennsylvania.
