= Firefly Aerospace Blue Ghost =

Lunar lander developed by Firefly Aerospace

Blue Ghost
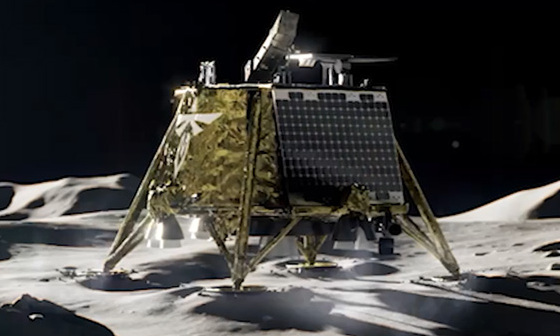
- Rendering of Blue Ghost Mission 1 on the Moon
- Manufacturer: Firefly Aerospace
- Designer: Firefly Aerospace
- Country of origin: United States
- Operator: Firefly Aerospace
- Applications: Lunar payload delivery and support

Specifications
- Spacecraft type: Lunar lander
- Payload capacity: 150 kg
- Power: 650 W

Production
- Status: Active
- On order: 5
- Built: 1
- Launched: 1
- Retired: 1

Firefly Aerospace Blue Ghost, or simply Blue Ghost, is a class of lunar landers designed and manufactured by the American company Firefly Aerospace. Firefly builds and operates Blue Ghost landers to deliver small payloads to the surface of the Moon. The first Blue Ghost mission was launched in January, 2025. It successfully landed on the Moon on March 2, 2025. The landers are named after the firefly species Phausis reticulata, known as blue ghosts.

== Overview ==
Firefly is the prime contractor for lunar delivery services using Blue Ghost landers. Firefly provides or subcontracts Blue Ghost payload integration, launch from Earth, landing on the Moon and mission operations. Firefly's Cedar Park facility serves as the company's mission operations center and the location of payload integration. Firefly operates a 50,000-square-foot (4,600 m^{2}) spacecraft facility with two mission control centers and an ISO-8 cleanroom to accommodate multiple landers.

The spacecraft design is adaptable to each customer’s cislunar needs. Blue Ghost can be customized to support larger, more complex missions, including lunar night operations, surface mobility, and sample return, and is compatible with multiple launch providers. Firefly asserts that in-house end-to-end manufacturing testing of the Blue Ghost structure is a differentiator among the CLPS landers.

On November 29, 2018, NASA announced that Firefly was among the companies eligible for task orders as part of the Commercial Lunar Payload Services (CLPS) initiative. As of August 18, 2025 NASA has awarded Firefly task orders for four lunar landing missions.

== Design ==
Blue Ghost supplies data, power, and thermal resources for payload operations during transit to the Moon, in lunar orbit, and on the lunar surface. Primary propulsion is provided by a LEROS 4-ET bipropellant main engine from Nammo UK. The engine uses MON and hydrazine as propellants. The engine can provide more than 1,000 N of thrust, and is used for both lunar orbit insertion and powered descent to the surface. Blue Ghost’s eight Spectre thrusters are used in its reaction control system to maintain orientation during maneuvers and to achieve a soft landing. The four carbon composite landing legs have contact sensors that trigger engine shutdown after landing. Solar panels provide up to 400W of electrical power. The lander has one X-band antenna and three S-band antennas for communication with Firefly's mission operations center.

== Missions ==
=== Blue Ghost M1 ===
On February 4, 2021, NASA awarded Firefly a CLPS task order worth US$93.3 million to deliver a suite of ten science investigations and technology demonstrations to the Moon. On May 20, 2021, Firefly selected Falcon 9 as the launch vehicle for the mission and on March 2, 2025, Blue Ghost Mission 1 successfully landed on the Moon, at Mare Crisium.

=== Blue Ghost M2 ===
The second Blue Ghost mission is scheduled for launch in late 2026. Both the lander and the Lunar Pathfinder spacecraft will be deployed into lunar orbit by an Elytra orbital transfer vehicle, launched by a SpaceX Falcon 9. Through JPL NASA has funded a User Terminal payload on the top deck of the lander, which will be used to commission the Lunar Pathfinder satellite. Firefly also intends to use this mission to deliver the Rashid 2 rover to the surface.

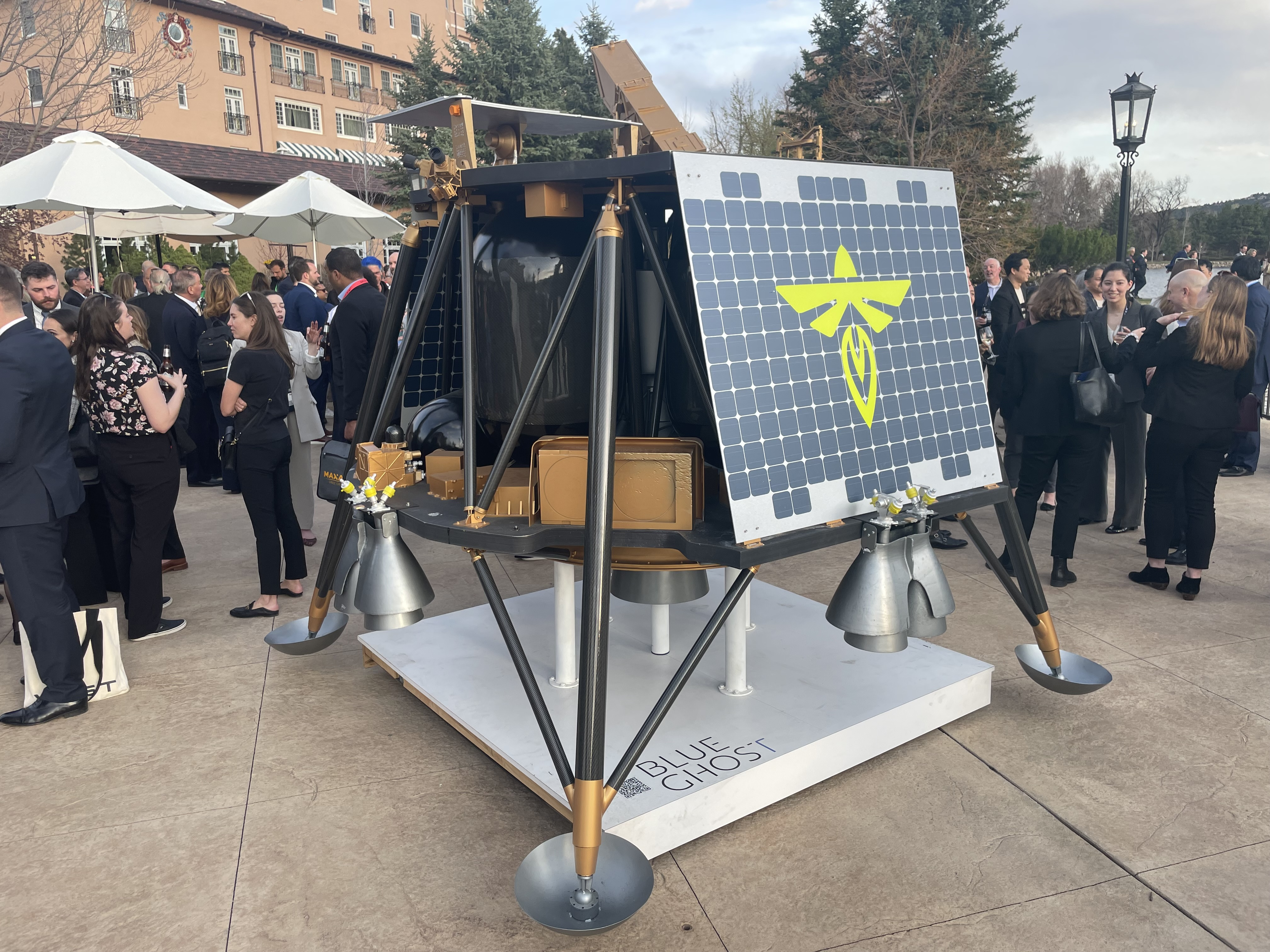
Blue Ghost lander mockup

=== Blue Ghost M3 ===
A third Blue Ghost mission is planned for 2028. The mission plan includes a rover, with a landing near the Mons Gruithuisen Gamma lunar dome. As part of the CLPS CP-21 task order, instruments from the Lunar-VISE project at University of Central Florida will be included on the lander and rover.

=== Blue Ghost M4 ===
A fourth Blue Ghost mission, planned for 2029, was announced on July 29, 2025. The mission plans to land on the rim of Haworth Crater near the lunar south pole. The mission will deliver two rovers and three scientific instruments to the lunar surface. One of those rovers, MoonRanger, had originally been scheduled for a mission which would have been conducted by Masten Space Systems. Another rover was expected to come from the Canadian company Canadensys Aerospace. In March 2026 the Canadian Space Agency ended the funding for that rover.

=== Blue Ghost M5 ===
In a September, 2025 filing with the SEC, Firefly reported that a "proprietary commercial customer" had selected Blue Ghost for an additional, dedicated mission.

== Funding ==
In 2017, Space Policy Directive 1 signaled the intention of returning NASA astronauts to the Moon. In 2018, NASA solicited bids from nine companies, including Firefly Aerospace, for the Commercial Lunar Payload Services (CLPS) program. CLPS is part of the NASA Artemis program; one of the long-term goals of Artemis is establishing a permanent crewed base on the Moon.

In 2021, Firefly Aerospace received a NASA contract that was valued at US$93 million to conduct lunar landings for NASA.

== See also ==
Other commercial lunar lander programs
- Blue Moon (Blue Origin)
- SERIES-2 (Draper)
- Peregrine (Astrobotic)
- Starship HLS (SpaceX)
- Hakuto-R Mission 1 (ispace)
- IM-1 and IM-2 (Intuitive Machines)
Lunar lander programs by country
- China: Chinese Lunar Exploration Program
- India: Chandrayaan Programme
- Russia: Luna-Glob
- United States: Commercial Lunar Payload Services (Artemis program)
- Japan: Japanese Lunar Exploration Program
