= Canadensys =

Canadian space systems company

Canadensys (formally Canadensys Aerospace Corporation) is a space systems and space vehicle development company in Ontario, Canada. Canadensys has a focus on micro- and nano-space technologies with 'smart' vehicle designs for planetary, orbital and terrestrial environments. It was founded in 2013.

== International Lunar Observatory ==
Canadensys provides technology support for the International Lunar Observatory ILO-X and ILO-1 space telescopes.

== ispace Mission 1 ==
With support from the Canadian Space Agency, Canadensys provided a camera capable of taking 360-degree images for the first ispace mission.

== IM-1 ==
ILO-X is a telescope currently on the lunar surface as part of the Intuitive Machines IM-1 lunar lander mission.

== Lunar rover ==
Canadensys was to provide one of the two rovers that were planned to be delivered to the lunar surface by Firefly's Blue Ghost Mission 4. However, in March 2026 it was announced that the Canadian Space Agency's 2026–27 Departmental Plan terminated work on the rover mission.
