= Lunar Surface Electromagnetics Experiment =

Planned radio telescope observatory

LuSEE-Night
- Operator: (United States) DOE, NASA
- Instrument type: Radio telescope

Host spacecraft
- Spacecraft: Blue Ghost Mission 2
- Launch date: 2027 (planned)

The Lunar Surface Electromagnetics Experiment (LuSEE-Night) is a planned robotic radio telescope observatory designed to land and function on the far side of Earth's Moon. The project is under development by the U.S. Department of Energy Brookhaven National Laboratory, the DOE Office of Science, UC Berkeley’s Space Sciences Laboratory and the National Aeronautics and Space Administration. If successfully deployed and activated, LuSEE-Night will attempt measurements of an early period of the history of the Universe that occurred relatively soon after the Big Bang, referred to as the Dark Ages of the Universe, which predates the formation of luminous stars and galaxies. The instrument is planned to be landed on the lunar far side in 2027 aboard the Blue Ghost Mission 2 lunar lander. LuSEE-Night, not to be confused with a companion lander planned for lunar landing in 2024 named LuSEE-Lite, is to be delivered to the lunar far side by Commercial Lunar Payload Services (CLPS).

== See also ==
- Netherlands–China Low-Frequency Explorer (NCLE)
- Chronology of the universe
- Large Aperture Experiment to Detect the Dark Ages
- Lunar Crater Radio Telescope
