= Blue Moon Pathfinder Mission 1 =

Blue Origin lunar lander test flight

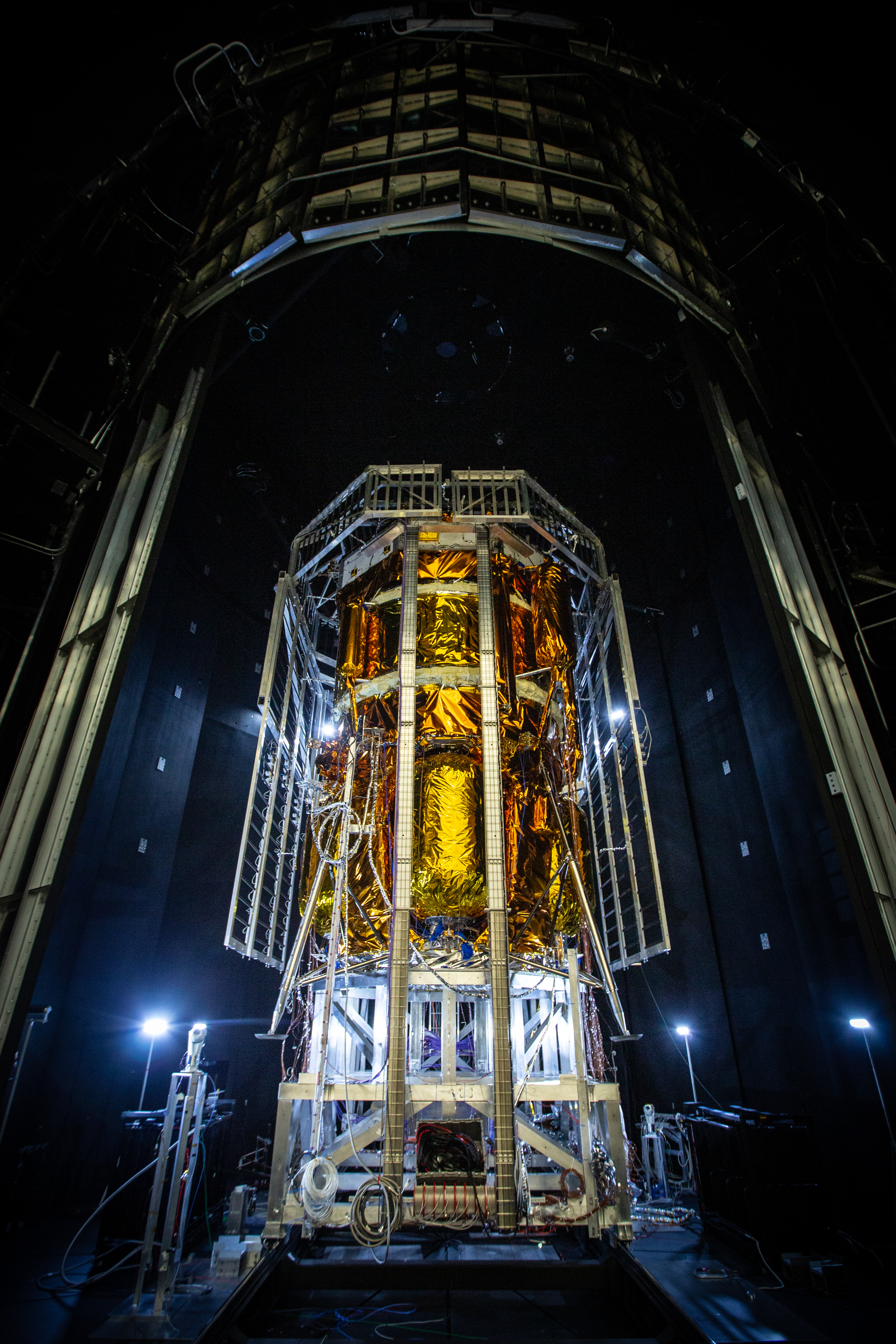
- Endurance during environmental testing at Johnson Space Center
- Names: CLPS TO CT-3
- Mission type: Lunar landing flight test
- Operator: Blue Origin

Spacecraft properties
- Spacecraft: Blue Moon MK1-101 Endurance

Start of mission
- Launch date: NET Q1 2027
- Rocket: New Glenn
- Launch site: Cape Canaveral, LC‑36

Moon lander
- Landing site: South Pole

Blue Moon Pathfinder Mission 1 is a robotic lunar landing mission planned for launch in 2027. The lander, given the name Endurance, will land at Shackleton crater near the lunar south pole. The spacecraft is built and operated by Blue Origin as part of NASA's Commercial Lunar Payload Services (CLPS) program, aimed at lunar science and exploration to support future crewed missions.

== Overview ==
The craft will land at Shackleton Connecting Ridge, near to the lunar south pole, and where future Artemis program missions are planned to land. The mission is designed to demonstrate capabilities that lower the risk of Artemis missions.

As a flight test of a prototype Blue Moon Mark 1 lander, the mission will demonstrate critical systems, including the BE-7 engine, cryogenic fluid power and propulsion systems, avionics, continuous downlink communications, and precision landing with an accuracy within 100 meters (330 ft). Validating these technologies is essential for supporting future Human Landing System missions under NASA's Artemis program, which will utilize the larger Blue Moon Mark 2 lander.

Blue Origin also plans to offer future Blue Moon Mark 1 missions to commercial, governmental, and institutional customers seeking lunar payload delivery. The Pathfinder mission is partially funded by NASA's Commercial Lunar Payload Services (CLPS) program, under which Blue Origin was awarded US$6.1 million in July 2024 to transport the Stereo Cameras for Lunar Plume Surface Studies (SCALPSS) payload.

== Payloads ==
- Stereo Cameras for Lunar Plume-Surface Studies (SCALPSS): Produced by the Langley Research Center, it is an array of four high-resolution cameras for collecting imagery of how the plume from the lander's high-thrust BE-7 engine interacts with the lunar surface during and after descent. Similar SCALPSS payloads were flown aboard the IM-1 and Blue Ghost Mission 1 CLPS missions. The data gathered will help scientists better understand the effects of rocket exhaust on the Moon's regolith, providing valuable insights for future Artemis missions.
- Laser Retroreflector Array (LRA): Manufactured by the Goddard Space Flight Center, it is an array of eight retroreflectors designed to determine the spacecraft's precise location and distance from Earth with the reflection of laser light from orbiting spacecraft.

== See also ==
- Starship HLS
- Apollo Lunar Module
