= Network-In-a-Box =

A Network-In-a-Box (NIB) is the combination of multiple components of a computer network into a single device (a 'box'), which are traditionally separated into multiple devices.

== History ==
In 2014, an open-source hardware Network-In-a-Box based on OpenBTS was deployed in West-Papua, Indonesia.
