= Astrobotic Technology =

American space robotics company

Astrobotic Technology, Inc.
- Type: Private company
- Industry: Aerospace; Robotics
- Founded: 2007; 19 years ago
- Founder: John P. Thornton; Red Whittaker
- Headquarters: Pittsburgh, Pennsylvania, U.S.
- Key people: John P. Thornton (CEO); Red Whittaker (Chairman); Paul C. O'Brien (Board of Directors); William Readdy (Board of Directors)
- Products: Autonomous robots; space systems; space payloads; robotic spacecraft; telerobotics
- Number of employees: 130 (As of 2023)
- Website: www.astrobotic.com

Astrobotic Technology, Inc., commonly referred to as Astrobotic, is an American private company that is developing space robotics technology for lunar and planetary missions. It was founded in 2007 by Carnegie Mellon professor Red Whittaker and his associates with the goal of winning the Google Lunar X Prize. The company is based in Pittsburgh, Pennsylvania.

Their first launch occurred on January 8, 2024, as part of NASA's Commercial Lunar Payload Services (CLPS) program. The launch carried the company's Peregrine lunar lander on board the first flight of the Vulcan Centaur rocket from Florida's Space Force Station LC-41. The mission was unable to reach the Moon for a soft or hard landing.

On June 11, 2020, Astrobotic received a second contract for the CLPS program. NASA would pay Astrobotic US$199.5 million to take the VIPER rover to the Moon, targeting a landing in November 2024. In July 2024, NASA announced that VIPER had been cancelled.

== History ==
In 2007, the team declared its goal to be the first commercial operation to land on the Moon. That year, the company completed a running prototype of a spacecraft called Red Rover; they also renamed their concept lander from Artemis Lander to Griffin.

On July 28, 2008, NASA gave money to Astrobotic for a concept study on "regolith moving methods". The next year, Astrobotic began to receive Small Business Innovation Research (SBIR) funding from NASA totaling over US$795,000 to investigate prospecting for lunar resources, which eventually led to a concept called Polar Excavator.

On October 15, 2010, NASA awarded a contract to Astrobotic for Innovative Lunar Demonstrations Data (ILDD) firm-fixed-price indefinite-delivery/indefinite-quantity contracts with a total value up to US$30.1 million over up to five years, and in December 2010, NASA's US$500,000 ILDD project for further Lunar Demonstrations Data was awarded to Astrobotic.

Astrobotic's proposal "Technologies Enabling Exploration of Skylights, Lava Tubes, and Caves" was a Phase I selection for NASA Innovative Advanced Concepts (NIAC). In April 2011, Astrobotic received a US$599,000 two-year contract to develop a scalable gravity offload device for testing rover mobility in simulated lunar gravity under NASA's Small Business Technology Transfer Program (STTR).

In May 2012, David Gump left the position of President of Astrobotic and John Thornton took his place.

On April 30, 2014, NASA announced that Astrobotic Technology was one of the three companies selected for the Lunar CATALYST initiative. NASA was negotiating a 3-year no-funds-exchanged Space Act Agreement (SAA) where the Griffin lander may be involved. The CATALYST agreement was extended in October 2017 for 2 years.

On June 2, 2016, Astrobotic Technology announced a new design of its Griffin concept lander and named it Peregrine. Airbus Defence and Space signed a memorandum of understanding to provide engineering support for Astrobotic as it refines the lander's design. In December 2016, Astrobotic slipped their estimated launch date to 2019 and separated from the Google Lunar X Prize.

On November 29, 2018, Astrobotic was declared eligible to bid on NASA's Commercial Lunar Payload Services to deliver science and technology payloads to the Moon. Astrobotic's successful bid drew a US$79.5 million contract to deliver payloads to Lacus Mortis. Astrobotic set an initial target of 14 payloads to launch starting in July 2021.

In September 2019, Spacebit signed an agreement to deliver the first UK lunar rover Asagumo on Astrobotic's upcoming mission in 2021 and named this "Spacebit mission one".

On September 25, 2019, John Thornton of Astrobotic was named CEO of the Year by the Pittsburgh Technology Council at the 23rd annual Tech50 awards ceremony.

On January 24, 2021, MrBeast, a YouTuber, said that he would place a payload on the Peregrine lander: a hard drive containing large numbers of digital image files submitted by anyone who contributed US$10 via his online store.

In June 2021, the maiden flight of Vulcan Centaur, carrying the first Peregrine lander as its payload, was delayed to 2022 due to payload and engine testing delays.

In November 2021, Astrobotic Technology was named one of the "World's Best Employers in the Space Industry" by Everything Space, a recruitment platform specializing in the space industry.

In September 2022, Astrobotic acquired Masten Space Systems, which had gone into Chapter 11 bankruptcy two months earlier. Masten was assigned to be "Astrobotic's Propulsion and Test Department". Among its assets is the Broadsword 110 kN 3D-printed aluminum engine, which continues to be developed.

Problems with ground systems during the wet dress rehearsal on December 8, 2023, delayed the maiden flight of the Vulcan Centaur until 2024.

The Peregrine lander was launched on January 8, 2024, from Florida's Space Force Station LC-41, aboard the maiden flight of Vulcan Centaur. A propellant leak prevented it from reaching the Moon for a soft or hard landing. The mission was never able to leave its original (highly elliptical) Earth orbit and it ended with a controlled reentry into the Earth's atmosphere above the Pacific Ocean on January 18, 2024.

In 2024, the company announced its ‘Luna Grid’ service. By combining the company’s landers and rovers equipped with its Vertical Array Solar Panels, the company hopes to be able to provide sustainable power on the lunar surface.

In June 2026, it was announced that Voyager Technologies was to acquire Astrobotic.

== Missions ==
=== Canceled missions ===
- In April 2011, Astrobotic contracted with SpaceX for a Falcon 9 launch of a lunar north pole mission for as early as December 2013. The mission was intended to launch the Griffin lander and deliver "a small rover and up to about 110 kg (240 lb) of payload to the surface of the Moon". The launch date slipped to 2015, and it was first named Polar Excavator, and then Icebreaker, that would target the lunar north pole. This expedition's rover was to be Polaris. A model of the Polaris rover was unveiled in October 2012, and the company indicated that they were still under contract to SpaceX for a Falcon 9 mission. The launch date further slipped to 2016, and Astrobotic contracted with two other GLXP teams including Team Hakuto and Team AngelicvM to share the launch expenses. The agreement was to launch the rovers of all teams on a single SpaceX Falcon 9 v1.1 which would then use the Astrobotic Griffin lander. After landing on the lunar surface, all teams would have competed against each other to achieve the specific GLXP objectives and earn the various prizes. The Griffin lander was never built, and Icebreaker mission was not launched.

- MoonRanger is a 13 kg (29 lb) rover being developed to carry payloads on the Moon for NASA's Commercial Lunar Payload Services (CLPS). The US$5.6 million contract was awarded to Astrobotic and its partner Carnegie Mellon University on July 1, 2019. MoonRanger was to be launched aboard Masten Mission One, the first XL-1 lunar lander. The rover was to carry science payloads yet to be determined and developed by other providers, that will focus on scouting and creating 3D maps of a polar region for signs of water ice or lunar pits for entrances to Moon caves. The rover would operate mostly autonomously for up to one week. Masten Mission One was cancelled after Masten Space Systems went bankrupt in 2022. Thus MoonRanger lost its flight to the Moon. On July 29, 2025, NASA announced that MoonRanger would be delivered to the lunar surface by a Firefly Aerospace Blue Ghost lander.

=== Peregrine Mission One ===
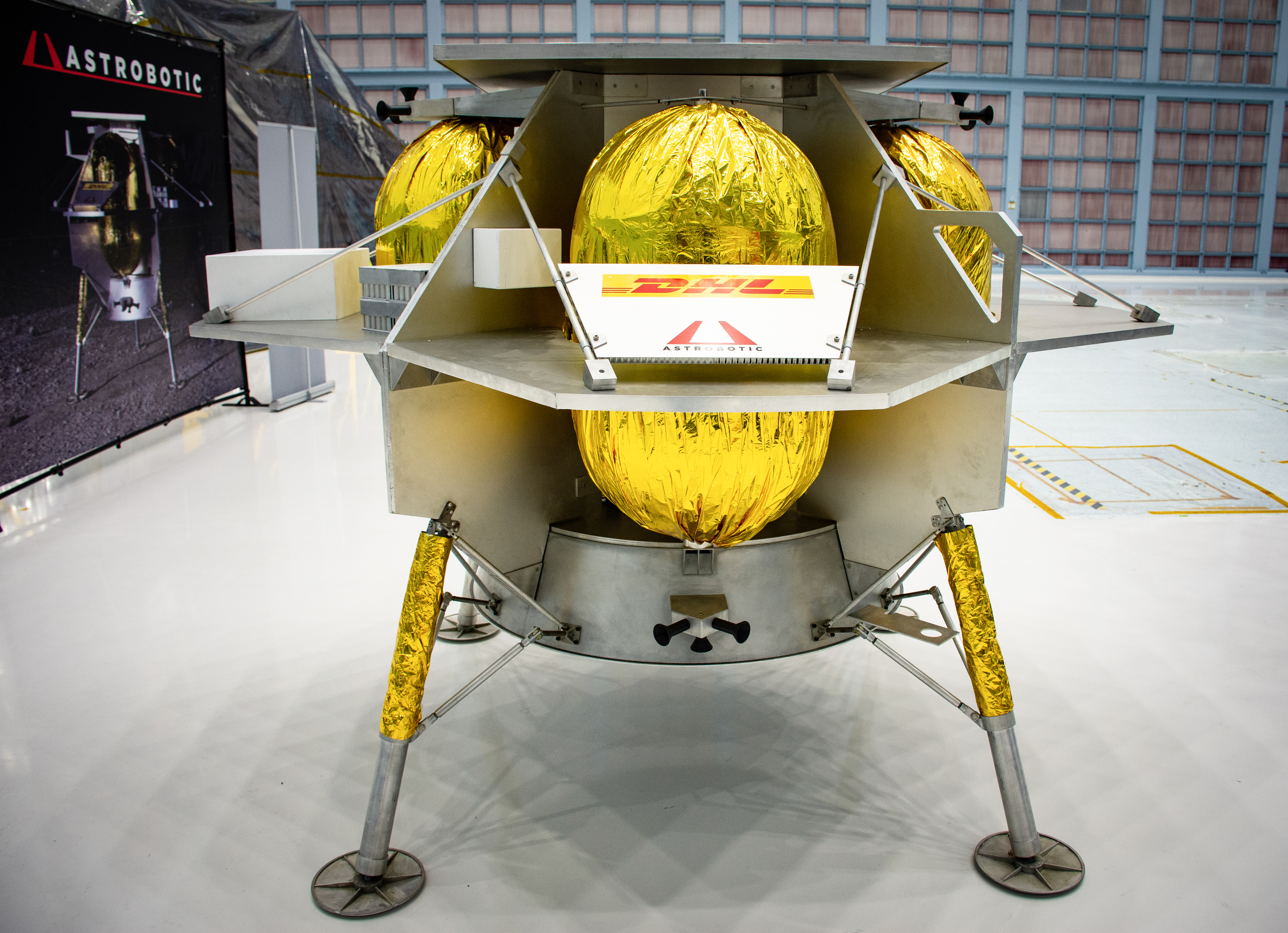
Peregrine lander model

Peregrine Mission One, or the Peregrine Lunar Lander, was a lunar lander built by Astrobotic Technology, that was selected through NASA's Commercial Lunar Payload Services (CLPS). It was launched on January 8, 2024 by United Launch Alliance (ULA) aboard a Vulcan Centaur launch vehicle. The lander carried multiple payloads, with total payload mass capacity of 90 kg.

Peregrine carried a maximum payload mass of 90 kg (200 lb) during Mission One, and it was planned to land on Gruithuisen Gamma. The payload mass for the planned second mission (Mission Two) is capped at 175 kg (386 lb), and the Mission Three and later missions would carry the full payload capacity of 265 kg (584 lb).

The Peregrine mission was unable to reach the Moon for a soft or hard landing. The mission was never able to leave its original (highly elliptical) Earth orbit and it ended with a controlled reentry into the Earth's atmosphere on January 18, 2024.

=== Griffin Mission One ===
The Griffin lander is targeted to land in a region of interest in the Moon's south polar region. The spacecraft is expected to operate for 100 days after its landing. NASA's VIPER rover was to be the main payload (450 kg) until VIPER was canceled in 2024. VIPER was to investigate permanently shadowed regions of craters located in the Moon's south pole, specifically for potential deposits of water ice that could be used as resources for future crewed missions. Other commercial payloads are on board the Griffin lander, including the Lunar Codex's Polaris archive of contemporary culture as one of the commercial sub-payloads of Astrobotics' MoonBox initiative.

=== Griffin Mission Two ===
Griffin Mission Two is a planned follow-up mission to be launched later.

== CubeRover ==
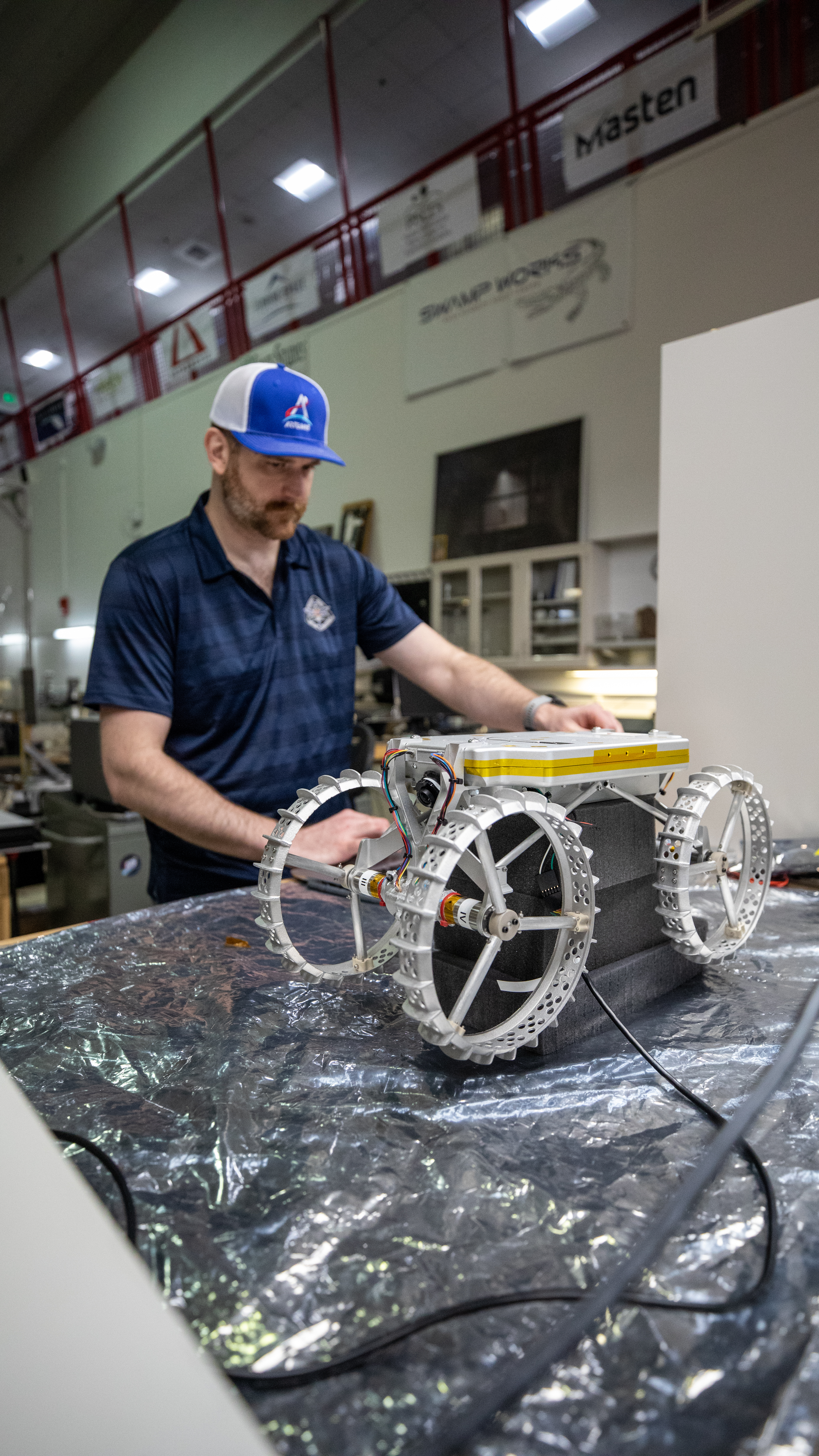
CubeRover

CubeRover is a class of planetary rovers with a standardized format meant to accelerate the pace of space exploration. The idea is equivalent to that of the successful CubeSat format, with a standardized architecture to assemble new units that will be all compatible, modular, and inexpensive. The rover class concept is being developed by Astrobotic Technology in partnership with Carnegie Mellon University, and it is partly funded by NASA awards. The principal investigator of the program is Andrew Horchler. The first derivative of a CubeRover, a spinoff rover called Iris, developed by CMU students, was planned to be deployed on the Moon on board Astrobotic's Peregrine lander, but was lost with Peregrine's reentry and never deployed.

CubeRover-1 will be carried to the Moon on Griffin Mission One, launching no earlier than December 2025.

== See also ==
- Exploration of Mars
- Exploration of the Moon
- Lunar rover
- Mars rover
