= Commercial Lunar Payload Services =

NASA program contracting commercial transportation services to the Moon

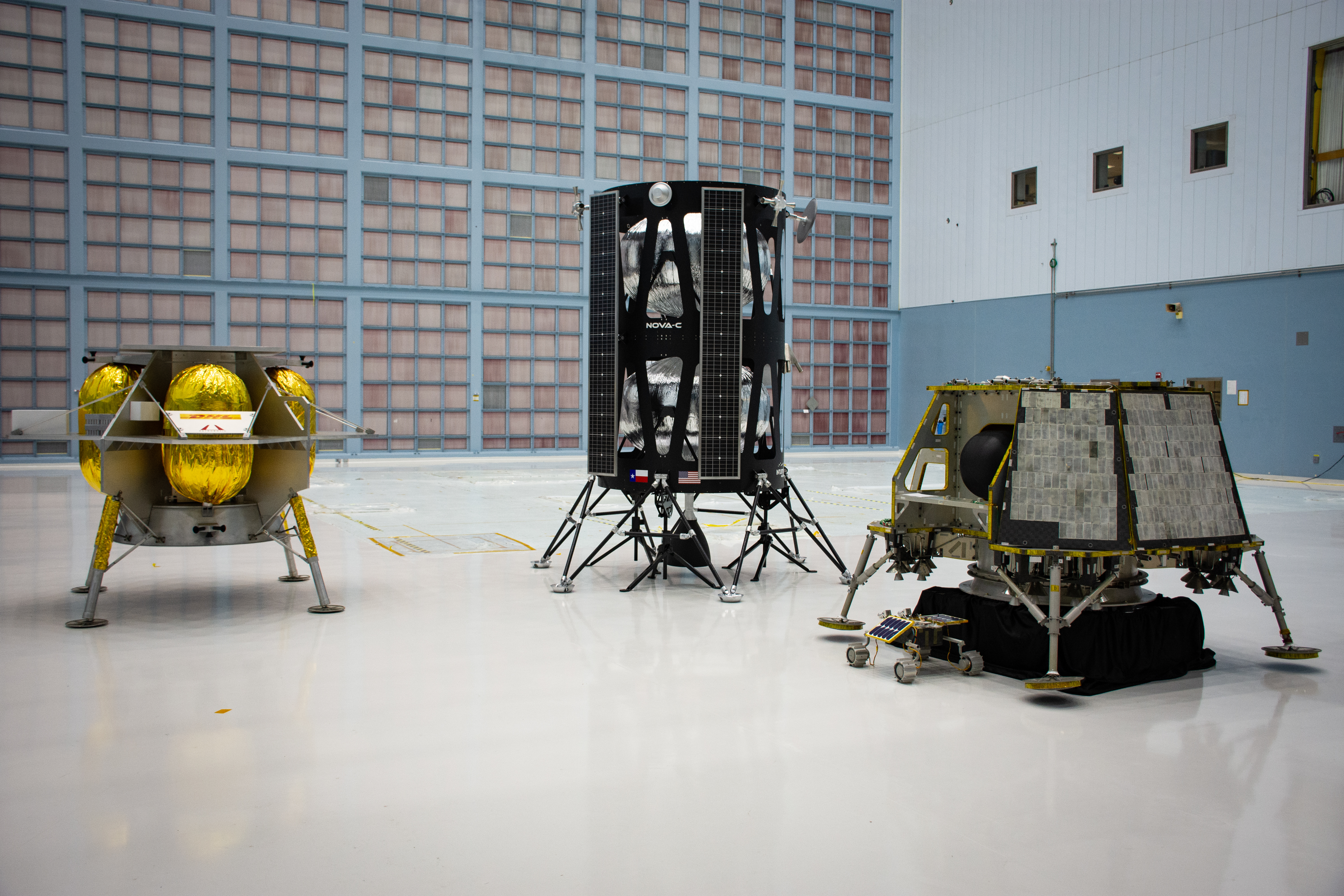
- Models of the first three commercial landers selected for the program. Left to right: Peregrine by Astrobotic Technology, Nova-C by Intuitive Machines, and Z-01 by OrbitBeyond.
- Type of project: Aerospace
- Products: Proposed: Artemis-7, McCandless Lunar Lander, XL-1, MX-1, MX-2, MX-5, MX-9, SERIES-2; Current: Peregrine, Griffin, Nova-C, Blue Ghost, APEX 1.0
- Owner: NASA
- Country: United States
- Established: 2018; 8 years ago
- Status: Active
- Website: NASA.gov/commercial-lunar-payload-services

Commercial Lunar Payload Services (CLPS) is a NASA program to contract private companies to develop robotic landers, rovers, and satellites for missions to the Moon. Most landing sites are near the lunar south pole where they will scout for lunar resources, test in situ resource utilization (ISRU) concepts, and perform lunar science to support the Artemis lunar program. CLPS is intended to buy end-to-end payload services between Earth and the lunar surface using fixed-price contracts. The program achieved the first landing on the Moon by a commercial company in history with the IM-1 mission in 2024. The program was extended to add support for large payloads starting after 2025. In 2026 NASA proposed a "CLPS 2.0" initiative.

The CLPS program is run by NASA's Science Mission Directorate along with the Human Exploration and Operations and Space Technology Mission directorates. NASA expects the contractors to provide all activities necessary to safely integrate, accommodate, transport, and operate NASA payloads, including launch vehicles, lunar lander spacecraft, lunar surface systems, Earth re-entry vehicles and associated resources.

Eight missions have been contracted under the program (excluding a mission contract that was revoked after awarding, and a mission contract that was cancelled after the contracted company went bankrupt).

== List of missions announced under CLPS ==
=== Missions contracted ===
Orbit Beyond returned their task order (canceling their mission) two months after the award in 2019. That mission is not listed below.

No	Name	Launch	Contractor	Lander	Launch Vehicle	Awarded	Lunar Destination	Notes	Outcome
TO2-AB	Peregrine Mission One	8 January 2024	Astrobotic Technology	Peregrine	Vulcan Centaur VC2S	May 2019	Gruithuisen Domes	Carried 5 CLPS payloads. Propellant leak prevented landing attempt.	Failure
TO2-IM	IM-1	15 February 2024	Intuitive Machines	Nova-C Odysseus	Falcon 9 Block 5	May 2019	Near Malapert-A	Carried 6 CLPS payloads. First landing. Significantly tipped after landing, limiting mission duration, but was still able to complete most scientific missions.	Partial failure
TO 19D	Blue Ghost Mission 1	15 January 2025	Firefly Aerospace	Blue Ghost	Falcon 9 Block 5	February 2021	Mare Crisium	Carried 10 CLPS payloads. First fully successful landing of the CLPS Program	Success
CLPS‑3	IM-2	27 February 2025	Intuitive Machines	Nova-C Athena	Falcon 9 Block 5	October 2020	Mons Mouton	Carried 4 CLPS payloads, including PRIME-1. Tipped during landing preventing few meaningful scientific experiments from being performed.	Failure
TO 20A	Griffin Mission I	January 2027	Astrobotic Technology	Griffin	Falcon Heavy	June 2020	Nobile Crater	Will carry FLIP rover from Venturi Astrolab. Also called Moon Base-2 .	Planned
CP‑11	IM-3	Early 2027	Intuitive Machines	Nova-C Trinity	Falcon 9 Block 5	November 2021	Reiner Gamma	Will carry payloads, including ESA's MoonLIGHT. Will deploy communications satellite to lunar orbit. Also called Moon Base-3 .	Planned
CS-3	Blue Ghost Mission 2	Early 2027	Firefly Aerospace	Blue Ghost & Elytra	Falcon 9 Block 5	March 2023	Far side	Will deliver a CLMSS payload to lunar orbit; LuSEE-Night to the surface. Should become first US soft landing on the far side of the Moon.	Planned
TO CT-3	Blue Moon Pathfinder Mission 1	Early 2027	Blue Origin	Blue Moon Mark 1	New Glenn 7x2	July 2024	Shackleton Connecting Ridge	Test flight of Blue Moon Mark 1 lander. Testing technologies for Human Landing System. Will carry Stereo Cameras and Laser Retroreflective Array.Also called Moon Base-1 .	Planned
CP‑22	IM-4	2027	Intuitive Machines	Nova-C	TBA	August 2024	South Pole	Will carry payloads including ESA's PROSPECT.	Planned
CS-7	Blue Moon Pathfinder Mission 2	Late 2027	Blue Origin	Blue Moon Mark 1	New Glenn 7x2	September 2025	South Pole	Has opportunity to carry NASA's VIPER Rover	Planned
CP‑21	Blue Ghost Mission 3	2028	Firefly Aerospace	Blue Ghost	TBA	December 2024	Gruithuisen domes		Planned
	Peregrine Mission Two	Late 2028	Astrobotic Technology	Peregrine	TBA	June 2026			Planned
	Peregrine Mission Three	Late 2028	Astrobotic Technology	Peregrine	TBA	June 2026			Planned
	IM-6	Late 2028	Intuitive Machines	Nova-C	TBA	June 2026			Planned
	Blue Ghost Mission 5	Late 2028	Firefly Aerospace	Blue Ghost	TBA	June 2026	Near Side		Planned
CS-6	Blue Ghost Mission 4	2029	Firefly Aerospace	Blue Ghost	TBA	July 2025	South Pole		Planned
	IM-5	2030	Intuitive Machines	Nova-D	TBA	March 2026	Mons Malapert		Planned

=== Missions announced but not yet contracted ===
No	Name	Launch	Contractor	Lander	Launch Vehicle	Awarded	Lunar Destination	Notes	Outcome
	TBA	2027	TBA	TBA	TBA	TBA	Ina volcanic crater	The DIMPLE payload, short for Dating an Irregular Mare Patch with a Lunar Explorer, will fly on a future CLPS provider's mission. DIMPLE will investigate the Ina irregular mare patch.	Planned

=== Cancelled missions ===
No	Name	Launch	Contractor	Lander	Launch Vehicle	Awarded	Lunar Destination	Notes	Outcome
	Masten Mission One	Intended: November 2023	Masten Space	XL-1	Falcon 9	April 2020	South Pole	Intended to deliver several hundreds of kilograms of payload to the lunar surface. Masten Space filed for bankruptcy in July 2022, with nearly all of their assets sold to Astrobotic Technology.	Cancelled
CLPS‑12	ispace Mission 5	2030	Draper Laboratory / ispace	Ultra	TBA	July 2022	Schrödinger Basin	Was expected to carry LuSEE-Lite. Farside Seismic Suite (FSS), Lunar Interior Temperature and Materials Suite (LITMS). Order cancelled in mutual agreement with NASA in July 2026.	Cancelled

== History ==
NASA has been planning the exploration and use of natural lunar resources for many years. A variety of exploration, science, and technology objectives that could be addressed by regularly sending instruments, experiments and other small payloads to the Moon have been identified by NASA.

When the concept study on the Resource Prospector rover was cancelled in April 2018, NASA officials explained that lunar surface exploration would continue in the future, but using commercial lander services under a new CLPS program. Later that April, NASA announced the Commercial Lunar Payload Services program as the first step in the solicitation for flights to the Moon. In April 2018, CLPS issued a Draft Request for Proposal, and in September 2018 the CLPS Request for Proposal was issued as a formal solicitation.

On November 29, 2018, NASA announced the first nine companies that would be allowed to bid on contracts, which were indefinite delivery, indefinite quantity contracts with a combined maximum contract value of $2.6 billion over ten years.

In February 2018, NASA issued a solicitation for Lunar Surface Instrument and Technology Payloads that may become CLPS customers. Proposals were due by November 2018 and January 17, 2019. NASA makes annual calls for proposals.

On May 31, 2019, NASA announced a list of awards, to Astrobotic, of Pittsburgh, Pennsylvania, $79.5 million; Intuitive Machines, of Houston, Texas, $77 million; and OrbitBeyond, $97 million; to launch their Moon landers. However, Orbit Beyond dropped out in July 2019 (with NASA acknowledging termination of contract on July 29, 2019), but remained able to bid on future missions. In January 2024, NASA reported the initial award to Astrobotic had grown to $108 million, to carry five NASA science payloads instead of the initial number of 14, and that the contract value for Intuitive Machines had increased to $118 million.

On July 1, 2019, a $5.6 million contract was awarded to Astrobotic and its partner Carnegie Mellon University to develop MoonRanger, a 13 kg (29 lb) rover to carry payloads on the Moon for NASA's CLPS. Launch was envisioned for either 2021 or 2022. The rover would carry science payloads yet to be determined and developed by other providers, that would focus on scouting and creating 3D maps of a polar region for signs of water ice or lunar pits for entrances to Moon caves. The rover would operate mostly autonomously for up to one week.

On November 18, 2019, NASA added five contractors to the group of companies eligible to bid to deliver large payloads to the lunar surface under the CLPS program: Blue Origin, Ceres Robotics, Sierra Nevada Corporation, SpaceX, and Tyvak Nano-Satellite Systems.

On April 8, 2020, NASA announced it had awarded the fourth (after Astrobotic's, Intuitive Machines' and OrbitBeyond's awards) CLPS contract for Masten Space Systems. The contract, worth $75.9 million, was for Masten's XL-1 lunar lander to deliver payloads from NASA and other customers to the south pole of the Moon in late 2022.

On June 11, 2020, NASA awarded Astrobotic Technology its second CLPS contract. The mission would be the first flight of Astrobotic's larger Griffin lander. Griffin weighs 450 kg. The award was for $199.5 million which covers Griffin lander and launch costs. The mission was scheduled for November 2024.

On October 16, 2020, NASA awarded Intuitive Machines their second CLPS contract for Intuitive Machines Mission 2 (IM-2). The contract was worth approximately $47 million. Using a Nova-C lander, the mission would land a drill (PRIME-1) combined with a mass spectrometer near the Lunar south pole, to attempt harvesting ice from below the surface. The mission was scheduled for December 2022, using a Falcon 9 rocket.

On February 4, 2021, NASA awarded a CLPS contract to Firefly Aerospace, of Cedar Park, Texas, for approximately $93.3 million, to deliver a suite of 10 science investigations and technology demonstrations to the Moon in 2023 (later delayed to 2024). This was the sixth award (seventh counting the OrbitBeyond award that was later cancelled) for lunar surface delivery (a lunar lander) under the CLPS initiative. This was the first delivery awarded to Firefly Aerospace, which would provide the lunar delivery service using its Blue Ghost lander, designed and developed at the company Cedar Park facility.

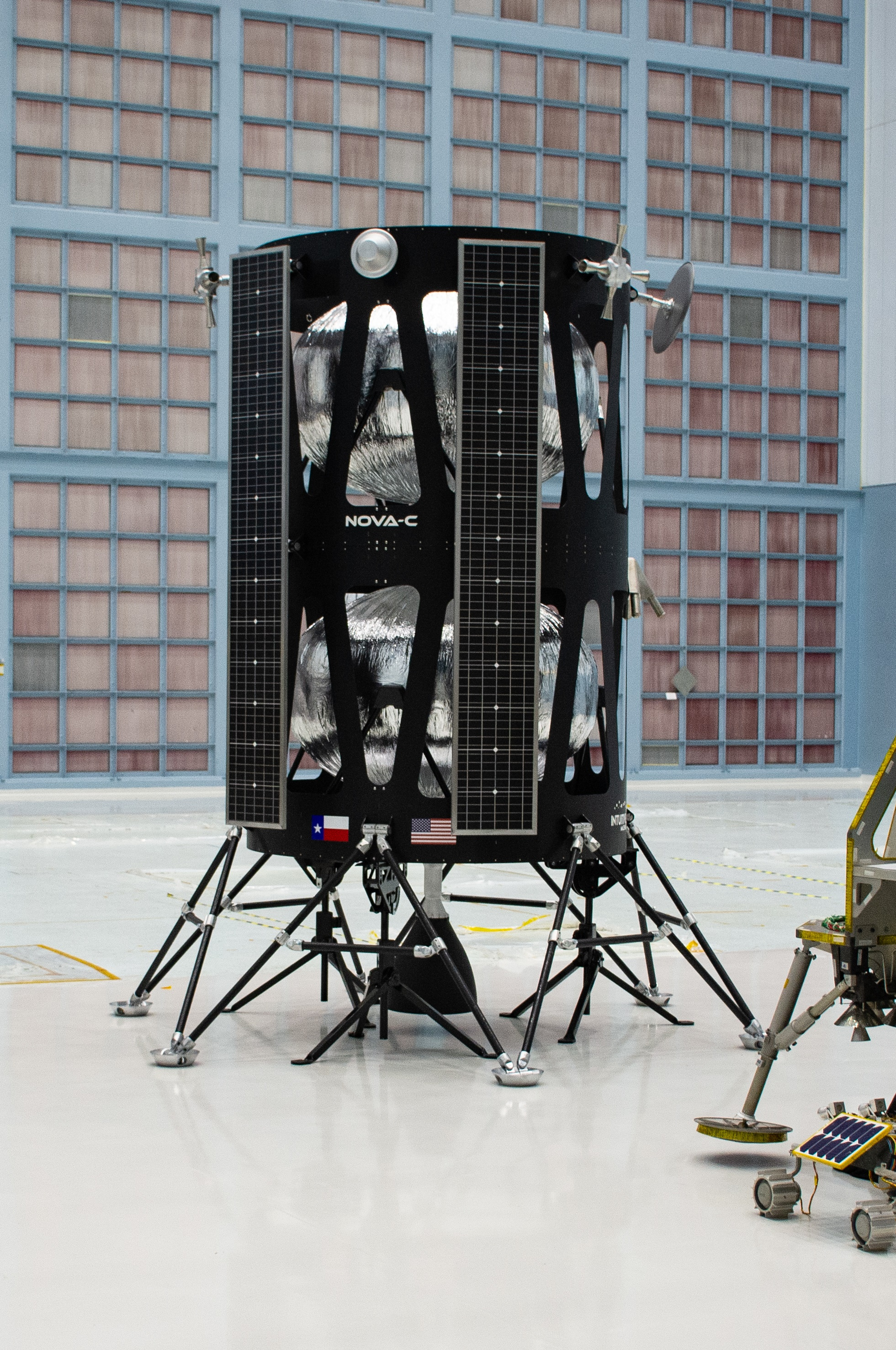
Nova-C lander model, on display in May 2019 at NASA's Goddard Space Flight Center in Greenbelt, Maryland

The next (seventh, not counting the OrbitBeyond contract) CLPS contract was awarded by NASA on November 17, 2021 to Intuitive Machines, their 3rd award. Their Nova-C lander was contracted to land four NASA payloads (about 92 kg in total) to study a lunar feature called Reiner Gamma. The mission was known as IM-3 mission and was planned to land on the Moon in 2024. The contract value was $77.5 million and under the contract, Intuitive Machines was responsible for end-to-end delivery services, including payload integration, delivery from Earth to the surface of the Moon, and payload operations.

On July 21, 2022, NASA announced that it had awarded a CLPS contract (8th, not counting OrbitBeyond) worth $73 million to a team led by the company Draper. The mission targeted Schrödinger Basin on the farside of the Moon, planned for 2025. The mission lander, called SERIES-2 by Draper, would deliver to Schrödinger Basin three experiments to collect seismic data, measure the heat flow and electrical conductivity of the lunar subsurface and measure electromagnetic phenomena created by the interaction of the solar wind and plasma with the lunar surface. This mission would be the first CLPS mission to target the lunar far side, and aims to be the second landing (after China's Chang'e-4) to the Moon's far side. The mission would also develop and deploy two data relay satellites, a must for missions in the lunar far side. Many companies are involved in the mission with Draper being the prime contractor, including ispace. On September 29, 2023, ispace announced that the SERIES-2 lander had been comprehensively redesigned and renamed as APEX 1.0, causing the mission to be delayed to 2026.

Masten Space Systems filed for bankruptcy in July 2022, with nearly all their assets sold to Astrobotic Technology. This led to the cancellation of Masten's CLPS mission.

On March 14, 2023, NASA awarded Firefly a $112 million task order (8th CLPS contract, not counting OrbitBeyond or Masten Space Systems) for a mission to the far side of the Moon using the second Blue Ghost lander, expected to launch in 2026.

On March 2, 2025, the Blue Ghost lander touched down on the moon around 3:30 a.m. Eastern Time. The spacecraft, built by Firefly Aerospace of Cedar Park, Texas, carried ten instruments for NASA as part of CLPS. Many will focus on lunar dust, which can be angular, sticky and sharp and is difficult for machinery to handle and can be challenging for the health of future astronauts.

== Overview ==
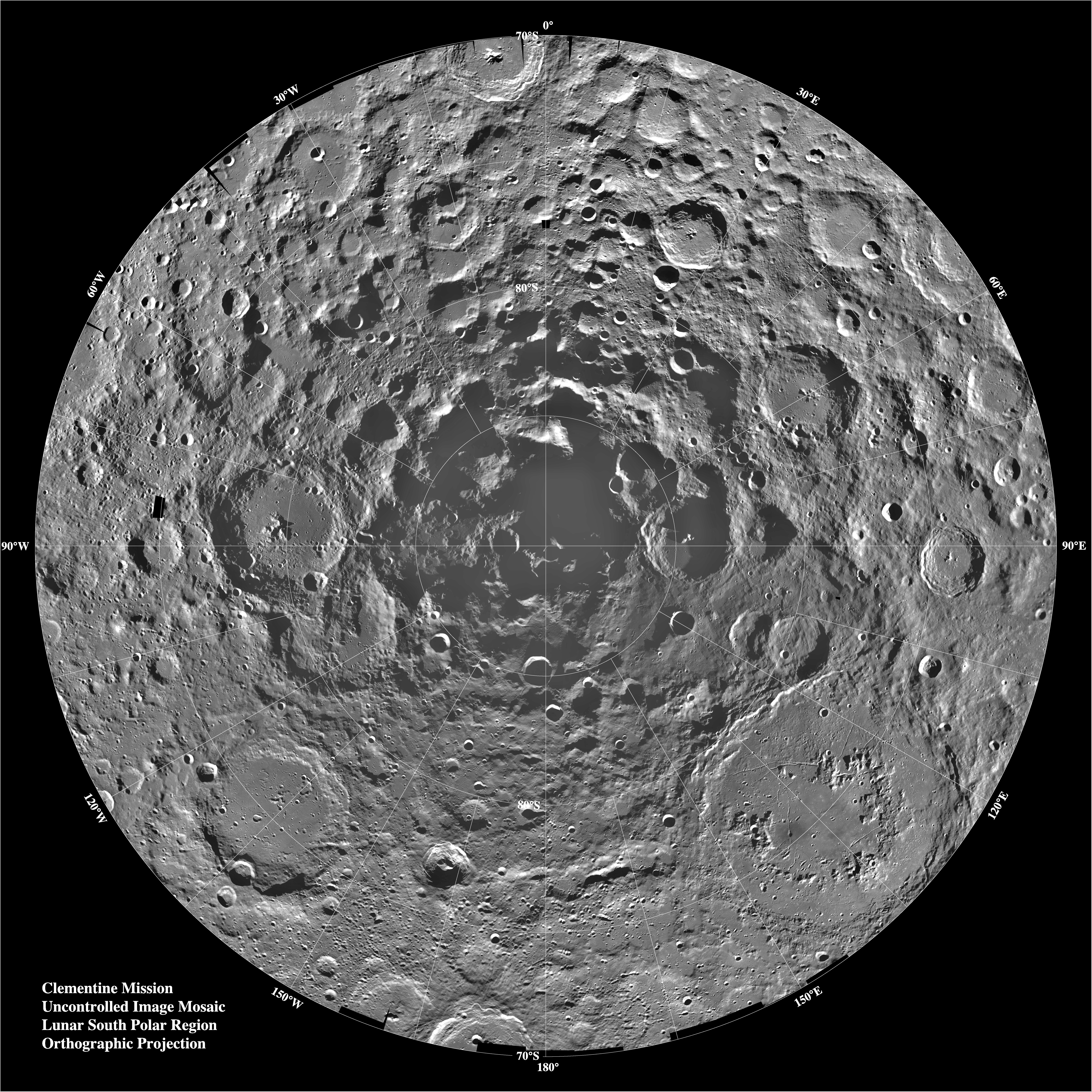
The lunar south pole region is of special interest because of the occurrence of water ice in permanently shadowed areas inside craters, near constant solar power at the crater rims, and abundant metals and oxygen in the regolith.

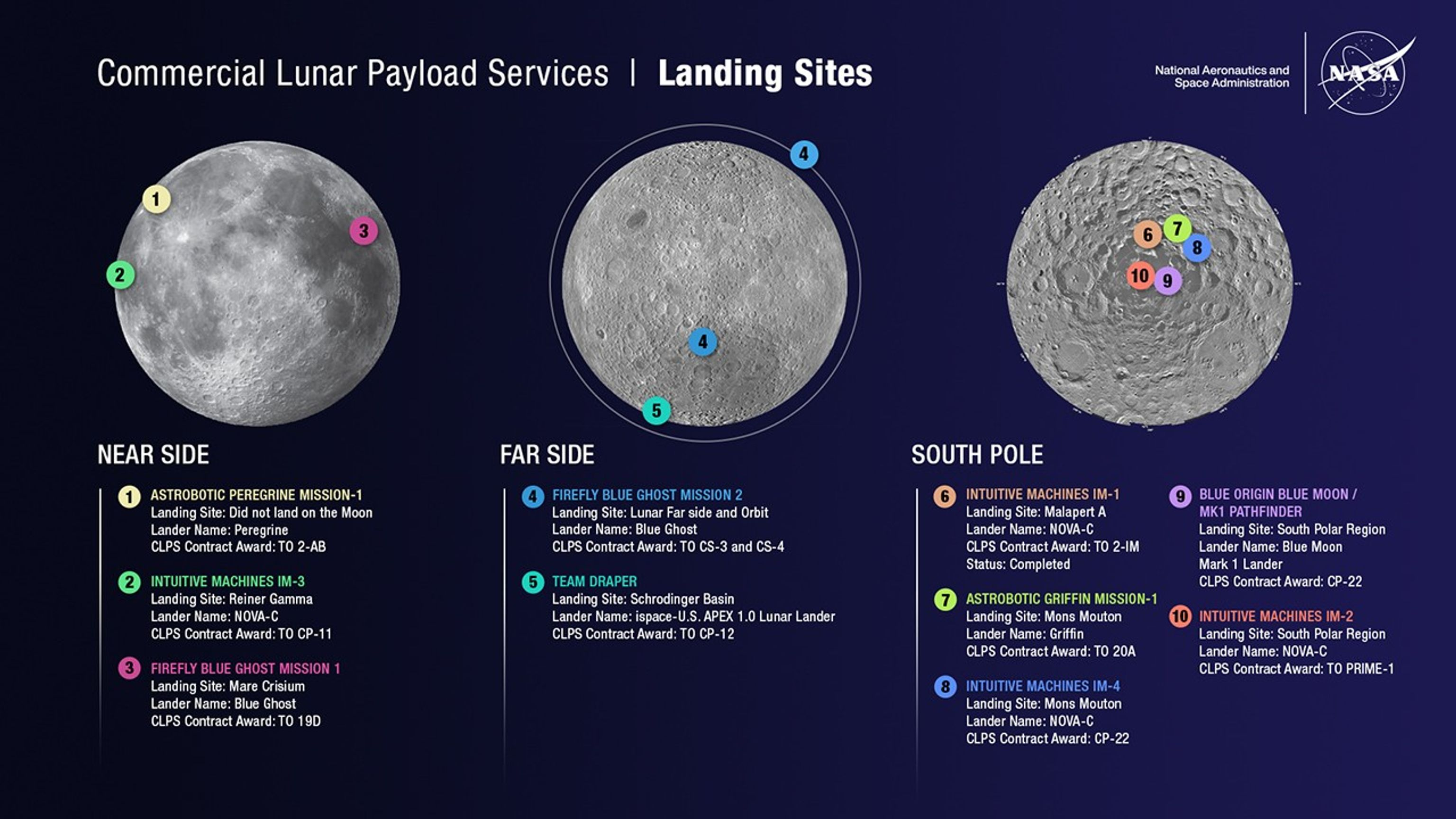
Landing sites of the CLPS missions

The competitive nature of the CLPS program is expected to reduce the cost of lunar exploration, accelerate a robotic return to the Moon, sample return, resource prospecting in the south polar region, and promote innovation and growth of related commercial industries. The payload development program is called Development and Advancement of Lunar Instrumentation (DALI), and the payload goals are exploration, in situ resource utilization (ISRU), and lunar science. The first instruments were expected to be selected by summer 2019, and the flight opportunities were expected to start in 2021.

Multiple contracts will be issued, and the early payloads will likely be small because of the limited capacity of the initial commercial landers. The first landers and rovers will be technology demonstrators on hardware such as precision landing/hazard avoidance, power generation (solar and RTGs), in situ resource utilization (ISRU), cryogenic fluid management, autonomous operations and sensing, and advanced avionics, mobility, mechanisms, and materials. This program requires that only US launch vehicles can launch the spacecraft. The mass of the landers and rovers can range from miniature to 1,000 kg (2,200 lb), with a 500 kg (1,100 lb) lander targeted to launch in 2022.

The Draft Request for Proposal's covering letter states that the contracts will last up to 10 years. As NASA's need to send payloads to the lunar surface (and other cislunar destinations) arises, it will issue Firm-Fixed Price 'task orders' on which the approved prime contractors can bid. A Scope Of Work will be issued with each task order. The CLPS proposals are being evaluated against five Technical Accessibility Standards.

NASA is assuming a cost of one million dollars per kilogram delivered to the lunar surface. (This figure may be revised after a lunar landing when the actual costs are available.)

== Contractors ==
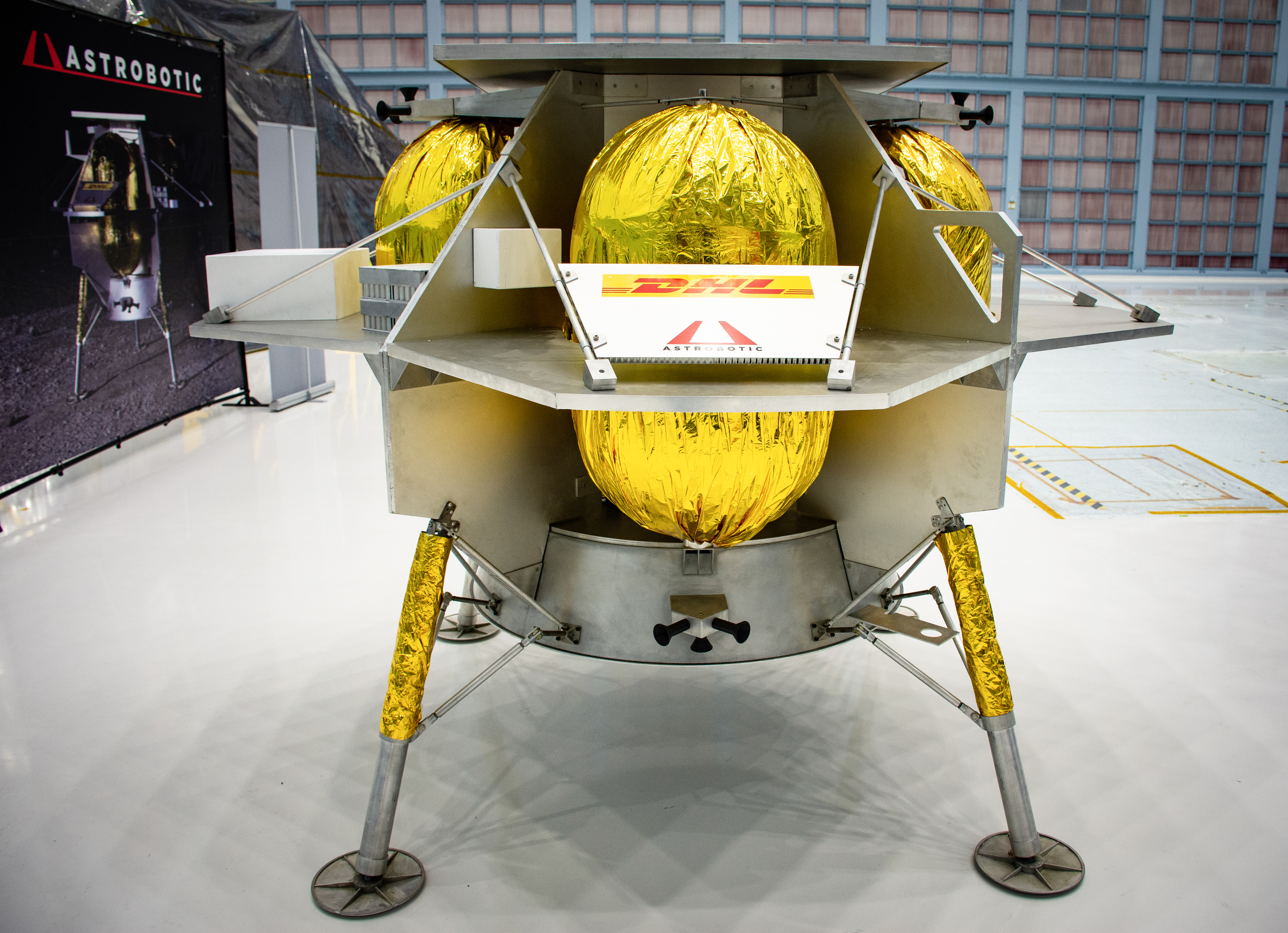
Astrobotic Peregrine

The companies selected are considered "main contractors" that can sub-contract projects to other companies of their choice. The first companies granted the right to bid on CLPS contracts were chosen in 2018.

On May 21, 2019, three companies were awarded lander contracts: Astrobotic Technology, Intuitive Machines, OrbitBeyond.

On July 29, 2019, NASA announced that it had granted OrbitBeyond's request to be released from this specific contract, citing "internal corporate challenges."

On November 18, 2019, NASA added five new contractors to the group of companies who are eligible to bid to send large payloads to the surface of the Moon with the CLPS program.

On April 8, 2020, NASA selected Masten Space Systems for a mission to deliver and operate eight payloads – with nine science and technology instruments – to the Moon's South Pole in 2022. Masten Space Systems filed for bankruptcy in July 2022; this led to the cancellation of Masten's CLPS mission.

On February 4, 2021, NASA awarded a CLPS contract to Firefly Aerospace for a mission to deliver a suite of 10 science investigations and technology demonstrations to the Moon in 2023.

On July 21, 2022, NASA announced that it had awarded a CLPS contract to Draper Laboratories.

On August 29, 2024 NASA announced that it awarded another CLPS task order to Intuitive Machines. The six payloads include four from NASA, one from the European Space Agency and one from the Laboratory for Atmospheric and Space Physics at the University of Colorado Boulder.

On July 29, 2025, NASA announced that it had awarded a fourth CLPS task order to Firefly (Blue Ghost-4). It will carry a Canadian Space Agency's lunar rover.

On June 30, 2026 NASA announce awards for four additional CLPS missions, two using Astrobotic Peregrine landers, one using a Firefly Blue Ghost lander and one using an Intuitive Machines Nova-C lander.

Eligible contractors and contract awards
Selection date	Company	Headquarters	Proposed services	First awarded contract
November 29, 2018	Astrobotic Technology	Pittsburgh, Pennsylvania	Peregrine and Griffin landers	May 31, 2019
November 29, 2018	Deep Space Systems	Littleton, Colorado	Rover; design and development services	
November 29, 2018	Draper Laboratory	Cambridge, Massachusetts	originally proposed Artemis-7 lander; contract awarded for SERIES-2 lander, to be built by iSpace	July 21, 2022
November 29, 2018	Firefly Aerospace	Cedar Park, Texas	Blue Ghost lander	February 4, 2021
November 29, 2018	Intuitive Machines	Houston, Texas	Nova-C lander	May 31, 2019
November 29, 2018	Lockheed Martin Space	Littleton, Colorado	McCandless Lunar Lander	
November 29, 2018	Masten Space Systems	Mojave, California	XL-1 lander	April 8, 2020
November 29, 2018	Moon Express	Cape Canaveral, Florida	MX-1, MX-2, MX-5, MX-9 landers; sample return.	
November 29, 2018	OrbitBeyond	Edison, New Jersey	Z-01 and Z-02 landers	(Note: Contract awarded 31 May 2019 and withdrawn 29 July 2019)
November 18, 2019	Blue Origin	Kent, Washington	Blue Moon lander	
November 18, 2019	Ceres Robotics	Palo Alto, California		
November 18, 2019	Sierra Nevada Corporation	Louisville, Colorado		
November 18, 2019	SpaceX	Hawthorne, California	Starship	
November 18, 2019	Tyvak Nano-Satellite Systems	Irvine, California		

=== CLPS 2 Contractors ===
NASA announced the first eight CLPS 2 contractors in November 2026. CLPS 2 is a 10-year, indefinite-delivery/indefinite-quantity (IDIQ) contract with a combined value of $10 billion, with the goal of increasing lunar landing cadence and reliability.

CLPS 2 Contractors
Date	Contractor	Headquarters	Proposed Services	First Contract Awarded
November 7, 2026	Blue Origin	Kent, Washington	Blue Moon lander	
November 7, 2026	Firefly Aerospace	Cedar Park, Texas	Blue Ghost lander	
November 7, 2026	Intuitive Machines	Houston, Texas	Nova-C and Nova-D landers	
November 7, 2026	iSpace US	Dove Valley, Colorado		
November 7, 2026	Lockheed Martin Space	Littleton, Colorado		
November 7, 2026	Northrup Grumman Space Systems	Beltsville, Maryland		
November 7, 2026	SpaceX	Hawthorne, California		
November 7, 2026	Voyager Technologies	Denver, Colorado	Griffin and Peregrine landers (Voyager acquired Astrobotic June 2026)	

== Payload selection ==
The CLPS contracts for landers and lander missions do not include the payloads themselves. The payloads are developed under separate contracts either at NASA facilities or in commercial facilities. The CLPS landers provide landing, support services, and sample return as specified in each individual contract.

The first batch of science payloads are being developed in NASA facilities, due to the short time available before the first planned flights. Subsequent selections include payloads provided by universities and industry. Calls for payloads are planned to be released each year for additional opportunities.

=== Lunar Discovery and Exploration Program ===
The Lunar Discovery and Exploration Program (LDEP) within the NASA Science Mission Directorate establishes contracts for the CLPS program and selects lunar science instruments that will use CLPS services. The CLPS Lunar Instrument Development process includes NASA Provided Lunar Payloads (NPLP), Lunar Surface Instrument and Technology Payloads (LSITP), Payloads and Research Investigations on the Surface of the Moon (PRISM), Development and Advancement of Lunar Instrumentation (DALI), Lunar Terrain Vehicle (LTV) Instruments and Artemis Surface Instruments. LDEP aspires to conduct at least two CLPS missions per year.

Delivery missions for these payloads were solicited in batches.

=== First batch ===
The first twelve NASA payloads and experiments were announced on February 21, 2019, and will fly on separate missions. As of February 2021 NASA has awarded contracts for four CLPS lander missions to support these payloads.

- Linear Energy Transfer Spectrometer, to monitor the lunar surface radiation.
- Magnetometer, to measure the surface magnetic field.
- Low-frequency Radio Observations from the Near Side Lunar Surface, a radio experiment to measure photoelectron sheath density near the surface.
- A set of three instruments to collect data during entry, descent and landing on the lunar surface to help develop future crewed landers.
- Stereo Cameras for Lunar Plume-Surface Studies is a set of cameras for monitoring the interaction between the lander engine plume and the lunar surface.
- Surface and Exosphere Alterations by Landers, another landing monitor to study the effects of spacecraft on the lunar exosphere.
- Navigation Doppler Lidar for Precise Velocity and Range Sensing is a velocity and ranging lidar instrument designed to make lunar landings more precise.
- Near-Infrared Volatile Spectrometer System, is an imaging spectrometer to analyze the composition of the lunar surface.
- Neutron Spectrometer System and Advanced Neutron Measurements at the Lunar Surface, are a pair of neutron detectors to quantify the hydrogen and therefore water near the surface.
- Ion-Trap Mass Spectrometer for Lunar Surface Volatiles, is a mass spectrometer for measuring volatiles on the surface and in the exosphere.
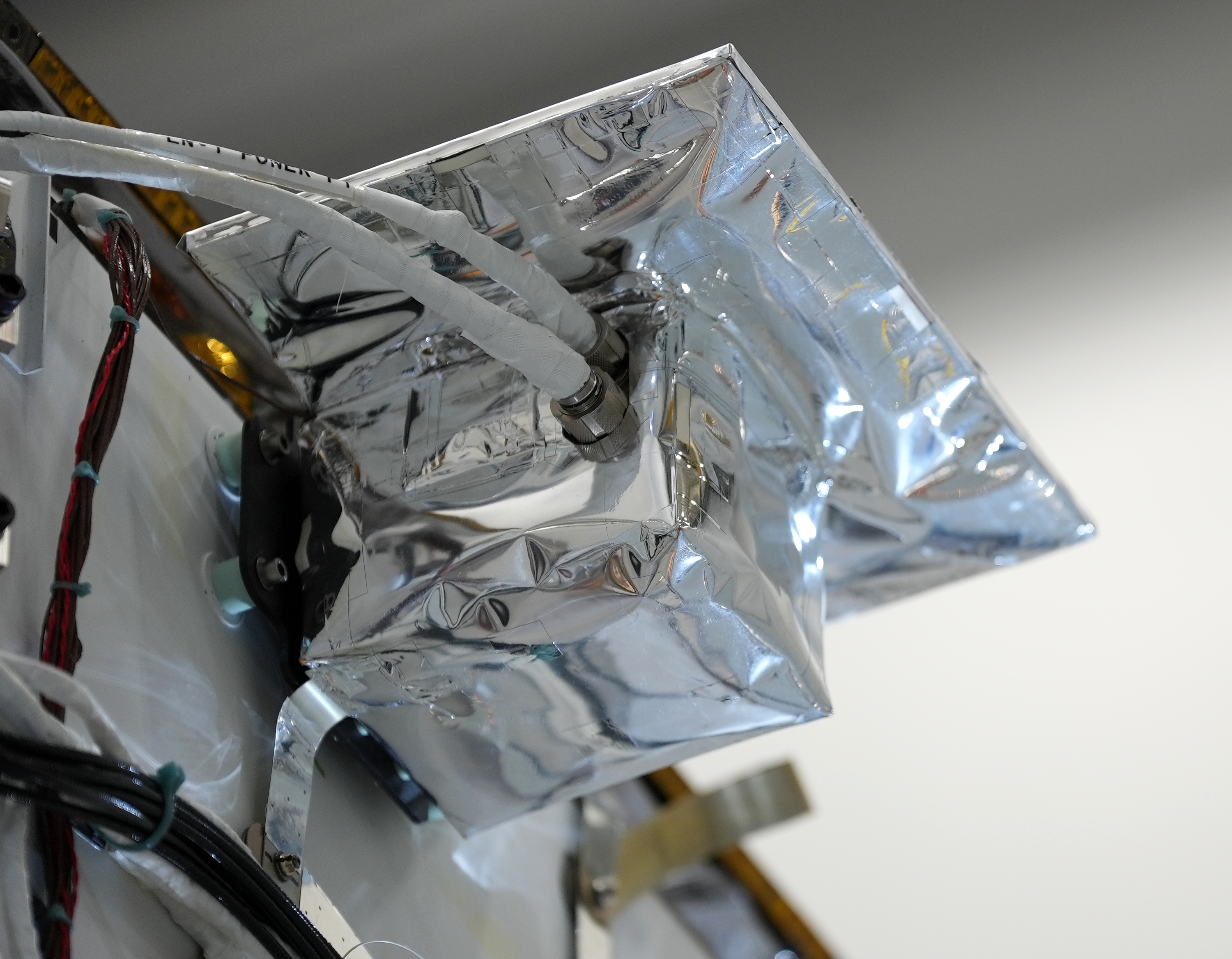
  Lunar Node-1 instrument of IM-1 Odysseus Lunar lander (February 2024)
- Solar Cell Demonstration Platform for Enabling Long-Term Lunar Surface Power, a next-generation solar array for long-term missions.
- Lunar Node 1 Navigation Demonstrator, a navigation beacon for providing geolocation for orbiters and landing craft.

=== Second batch ===
On July 1, 2019, NASA announced the selection of twelve additional payloads, provided by universities and industry. Seven of these are scientific investigations while five are technology demonstrations.

- MoonRanger, a small, fast-moving rover that has the capability to drive beyond communications range with a lander and then return to it. To be made by Astrobotic Technology, Incorporated, it was to be launched aboard the canceled Masten Mission One.
- Heimdall, a camera system with flight heritage on MSL, OSIRIS-REx and GOSAT-2, including four CMOS cameras and a DVR. Designed and built by MSSS for the Planetary Science Institute. Selected through LSITP.
- Lunar Demonstration of a Reconfigurable, Radiation Tolerant Computer System, which will demonstrate a radiation-tolerant computing technology. Montana State University.
- Regolith Adherence Characterization (RAC) Payload, which will determine how lunar regolith sticks to a range of materials exposed to the Moon's environment. Alpha Space Test and Research Alliance, LLC.
- The Lunar Magnetotelluric Sounder (LMS), which will characterize the structure and composition of the Moon's mantle by studying electric and magnetic fields. Southwest Research Institute. Planned for flight aboard Blue Ghost. Also part of the Lunar Interior Temperature and Materials Suite planned for launch in 2026.
- The Lunar Surface Electromagnetics Experiment (LuSEE), which will make comprehensive measurements of electromagnetic phenomena on the surface of the Moon. University of California, Berkeley.
- The Lunar Environment heliospheric X-ray Imager (LEXI), which will capture images of the interaction of Earth's magnetosphere with solar wind. Boston University.
- Next Generation Lunar Retroreflectors (NGLR), which will serve as a target for lasers on Earth to precisely measure the Earth-Moon distance. University of Maryland.
- Lunar Compact InfraRed Imaging System (L-CIRiS), an infrared radiometer to explore the Moon's surface composition and temperature distribution. Built for the University of Colorado by Ball Aerospace. Selected through LDEP.
- The Lunar Instrumentation for Subsurface Thermal Exploration with Rapidity (LISTER), an instrument designed to measure heat flow from the interior of the Moon. Texas Tech University. Planned for flight aboard Blue Ghost. Also part of the Lunar Interior Temperature and Materials Suite planned for launch in 2026.
- PlanetVac, a technology for acquiring and transferring lunar regolith from the surface to other instruments or place it in a container for its potential return to Earth. Honeybee Robotics, Ltd; development sponsored by The Planetary Society.
- SAMPLR: Sample Acquisition, Morphology Filtering, and Probing of Lunar Regolith, a sample acquisition technology that will make use of a robotic arm. Maxar Technologies.

=== Third batch ===
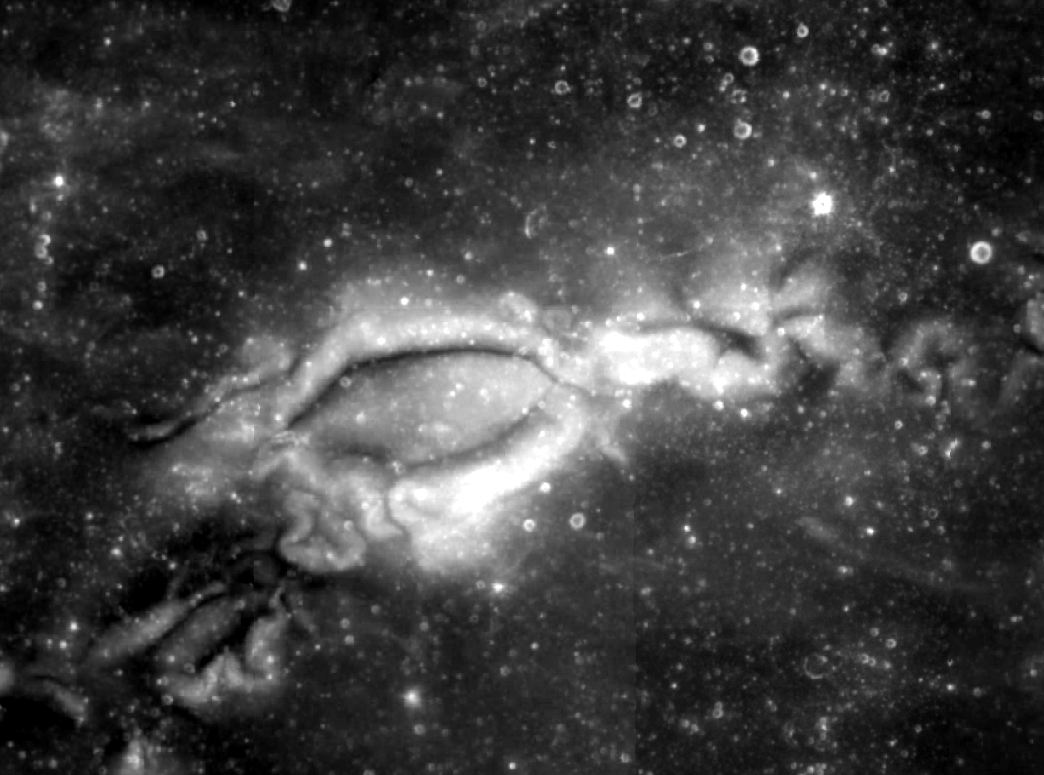
The lunar swirl known as Reiner Gamma (60 km width), seen at 750 nm by the Clementine spacecraft (July 2011)

In June 2021, NASA announced the selection of three payloads from its Payloads and Research Investigations on the Surface of the Moon (PRISM) call for proposals. These payloads were to have been sent to Reiner Gamma and Schrödinger Basin in the 2023–2024 timeframe.

- Lunar Vertex: a joint lander and rover payload suite slated for delivery to Reiner Gamma to investigate lunar swirls. Assigned to IM-3 lander mission. Applied Physics Laboratory.
- Farside Seismic Suite (FSS): two seismometers, the vertical Very Broadband seismometer and the Short Period sensor, will measure seismic activity on the far side of the Moon at Schrödinger Basin. Assigned to an ispace lander mission. Jet Propulsion Laboratory.
- Lunar Interior Temperature and Materials Suite (LITMS): two instruments, the Lunar Instrumentation for Subsurface Thermal Exploration with Rapidity pneumatic drill and the Lunar Magnetotelluric Sounder, previously selected in the second batch and slated for delivery to Schrödinger Basin. Will complement data acquired by the FSS. Southwest Research Institute.

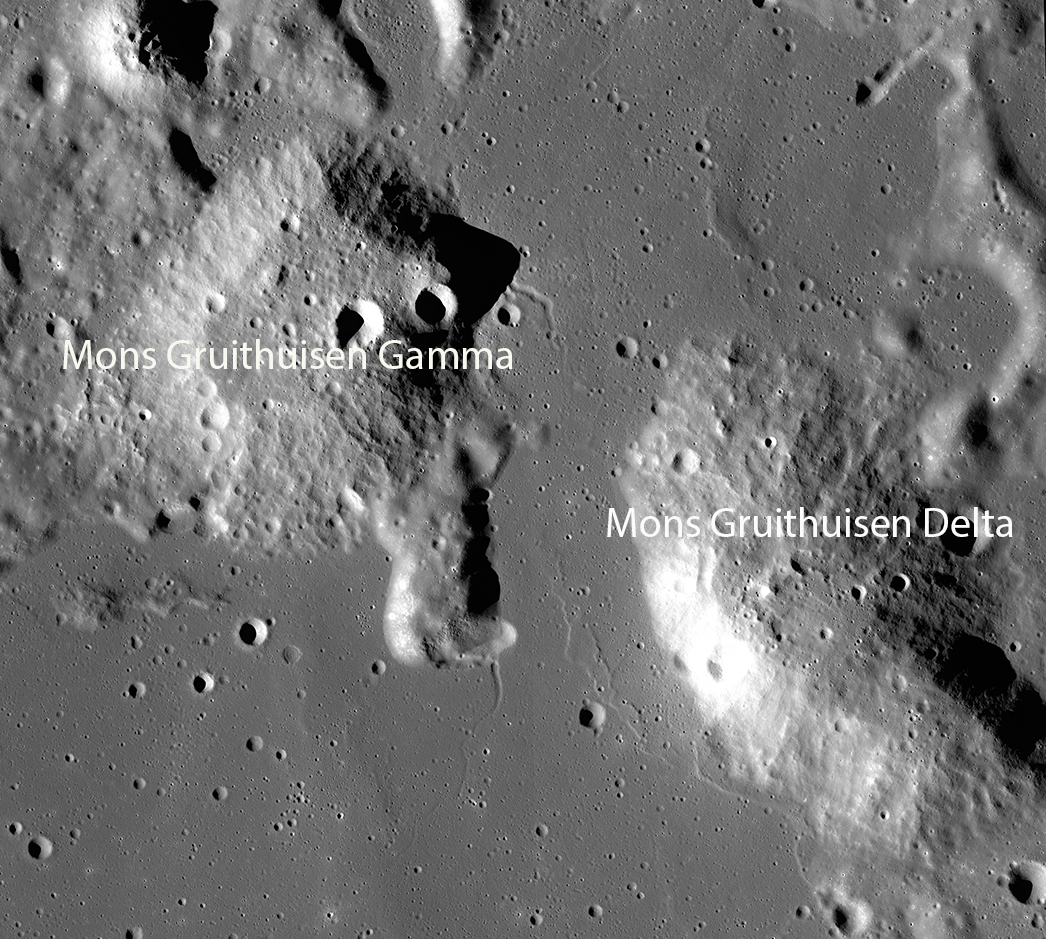
Gruithuisen Domes: the Gamma and Delta domes are separated by a relatively flat basaltic plain (2021)

=== Fourth batch ===
In June 2022, NASA announced the selection of two new payloads from its Payloads and Research Investigations on the Surface of the Moon (PRISM) call for proposals.

The Lunar Vulkan Imaging and Spectroscopy Explorer (Lunar-VISE) investigation is a suite of five instruments, two of which will be mounted on a stationary lander and three mounted on a mobile rover to be provided as a service by the CLPS vendor. Lunar-VISE will study a rare form of lunar volcanism. Lunar-VISE will be sent to one of the Gruithuisen Domes: Mons Gruithuisen Gamma or Mons Gruithuisen Delta.

The Lunar Explorer Instrument for space biology Applications (LEIA) science suite, is a small CubeSat-based device. LEIA will provide biological research on the Moon – which cannot be simulated or replicated with high fidelity on the Earth or International Space Station – by delivering the yeast Saccharomyces cerevisiae to the lunar surface and studying its response to radiation and lunar gravity. Saccharomyces cerevisiae serves as a model organism used to understand DNA damage response and repair.

=== Other selections ===
In September 2026 NASA selected three additional PRISM payloads: LEMS-SP, GIMLI and DISCO.

== See also ==
- Commercial Orbital Transportation Services – Former NASA program
- Lunar CATALYST
- Lunar Gateway – Cancelled lunar orbital space station
- Lunar water – Presence of water on the Moon
- NewSpace – Spaceflight not by a government
- Commercial Resupply Services
- Coordinated Lunar Time
