= List of rovers on extraterrestrial bodies =

A rover is a planetary surface exploration vehicle designed to move over the surface of a planet or other celestial body to explore, collect information, and take samples. This is a list of the seven lunar rovers, seven Mars rovers, and three asteroid rovers that have explored extraterrestrial bodies. In addition, a small helicopter, Ingenuity, operated on Mars from 2021 to 2024.

== Moon ==
Mission	Rover	Country/Agency	Date of landing	Coordinates	Operational time	Distance travelled	Outcome
Luna E-8 No.201	Lunokhod	(Soviet Union) Lavochkin	19 February 1969	N/A	0 days	0 km	Launch failure
Luna E-8 No.201	First launch of the Lunokhod rover. Launch vehicle disintegrated 51 seconds after launch and exploded.						
Luna 17	Lunokhod 1	(Soviet Union) USSR	17 November 1970	38.2378°N 35.0017°W	322 days	10.5 km (6.5 mi)	Successful
Luna 17	First rover on an extraterrestrial body.						
Luna 21	Lunokhod 2	(Soviet Union) USSR	15 January 1973	25.85°N 30.45°E	117 days	39 km (24 mi)	Successful
Luna 21	Farthest distance traveled on the Moon.						
Chang'e 3	Yutu	(China) CNSA	14 December 2013	44.1214°N 19.5116°W	42 days (mobile); 973 days (total)	114.8 m (377 ft)	Successful
Chang'e 3	First Chinese extraterrestrial rover and first lunar rover in over 40 years.						
Chang'e 4	Yutu-2	(China) CNSA	3 January 2019	45.444°S 177.599°E	2872 days	1.455 km (0.904 mi) as of 3 January 2023	Operational
Chang'e 4	First rover on the far side of the Moon. Longest fully functioning rover on the Moon.						
Chandrayaan-2	Pragyan	(India) ISRO	6 September 2019	70.90°S 22.78°E	0 days	0 km	Precluded
Chandrayaan-2	Lost when Vikram lander crash landed on the Moon.						
Hakuto-R Mission 1	Rashid	(United Arab Emirates) MBRSC	April 2023	47.581°N 44.094°E	0 days	0 km	Precluded
Hakuto-R Mission 1	Sora-Q	(Japan) Tomy/JAXA/Doshisha University	April 2023	47.581°N 44.094°E	0 days	0 km	Precluded
Hakuto-R Mission 1	Contact lost during final descent of the Hakuto-R Mission 1 lander. Presumed crash landing and failure.						
Chandrayaan-3	Pragyan	(India) ISRO	23 August 2023	69.373°S 32.319°E	12 days	101.4 m (333 ft) as of 2 September 2023	Successful
Chandrayaan-3	First rover to successfully operate near lunar south pole.						
SLIM	LEV-1	(Japan) JAXA	19 January 2024	13.3160°S 25.2510°E	1 hour and 51 minutes		Successful
SLIM	LEV-2 (Sora-Q)	(Japan) JAXA	19 January 2024	13.3160°S 25.2510°E	1 hour and 51 minutes		Successful
SLIM	A hopper and a rover included in the SLIM mission which demonstrated precision landing technology.						
Peregrine Mission One	Iris	(United States) CMU	2024	N/A	0 days	0 km	Precluded
Peregrine Mission One	Colmena x5	(Mexico) UNAM	2024	N/A	0 days	0 km	Precluded
Peregrine Mission One	Colmena would have been deployed using a small catapult mechanism. Mission cancelled along with the cancelled landing of Peregrine lander due to excessive propellant leak.						
Chang'e 6	Jinchan	(China) CNSA	1 June 2024	41.63839°S 153.98545°W	4 days		Successful
Chang'e 6	Conduct infrared spectroscopy of lunar surface and imaged Chang'e 6 lander on lunar surface.						
IM-2	MAPP LV1	(United States) Lunar Outpost	6 March 2025	84.7906°S 29.1957°E	0 days	0 km	Precluded
IM-2	AstroAnt	(United States) MIT	6 March 2025	84.7906°S 29.1957°E	0 days	0 km	Precluded
IM-2	Micro-Nova	(United States) Intuitive Machines	6 March 2025	84.7906°S 29.1957°E	0 days	0 km	Precluded
IM-2	Yaoki	(Japan) Dymon	6 March 2025	84.7906°S 29.1957°E	0 days	0 km	Precluded
IM-2	MAPP and Micro-Nova would have demonstrated a new lunar communication system. IM-2 landed on 6 March 2025. The spacecraft was intact after touchdown but resting on its side, thereby complicating its planned science and technology demonstration mission; this outcome is similar to what occurred with the company's IM-1 Odysseus spacecraft in 2024.						
Hakuto-R Mission 2	Tenacious	(Luxembourg) ispace Europe	June 2025	60.4445°N 4.588°W	0 days	0 km	Precluded
Hakuto-R Mission 2	Hakuto-R Mission 2 featured a rover for surface exploration and data collection. Contact lost during final descent of the Hakuto-R Mission 2 lander. Presumed crash landing and failure.						
Chang’e 7	Chang’e 7 rover	(China) CNSA	2027 (TBD)	TBD			Planned
Chang’e 7	Chang’e 7 hopper	(China) CNSA	2027 (TBD)	TBD			Planned
Chang’e 7	Will search for water ice in and around Shackleton crater in the south pole of the Moon.						
Griffin-1	CubeRover-1	(United States) Astrobotic	2026	TBD			Planned
Griffin-1	FLIP	(United States) Astrolab	2026	TBD			Planned
IM-3	Lunar Vertex	(United States) NASA	2026	TBD			Planned
IM-3	CADRE x4	(United States) NASA	2026	TBD			Planned
IM-3	Mission to study Reiner Gamma.						
Starship lunar cargo mission	FLEX	(United States) Astrolab	TBD	TBD			Planned
Starship lunar cargo mission	Astrolab contracted with SpaceX to send their rover to the Moon aboard Starship						
Griffin-2	⚀ LunaGrid-Lite CubeRover	(United States) Astrobotic	2027	TBD			Planned
Griffin-2	Third lunar mission by Astrobotic, will land at lunar south pole. LunaGrid-Lite mission.						
LUPEX	LUPEX Rover	(Japan) JAXA (India) ISRO	2028	TBD			Planned
LUPEX	Joint mission between ISRO and JAXA.						
Chang’e 8	Chang’e 8 rover	(China) CNSA	2028	TBD			Planned
Chang’e 8	Chang’e 8 Robot	(China) CNSA	2028	TBD			Planned
Chang’e 8	Chinese ISRU mission in preparation for ILRS.						
Jinnah-1	South Pole Rover	(Pakistan) SUPARCO	2028	TBD			Planned
Jinnah-1	South Pole Rover	Pakistan's first Lunar rover that will be launched aboard the Chang'e 8 mission. The mission is part of the wider ILRS program.					
IM-5	Roo-ver	(Australia) ASA	2030	Mons Malapert	~14 Days	TBD	Planned
IM-5	Roo-ver	Australia's first Lunar Rover,					
KLEP	KLLR Rover	(South Korea) KARI	2032	TBD			Planned
KLEP	Second mission of the Korean Lunar Exploration Program.						
PROMISE	PROMISE	(United States) NASA	late 2028	TBD			Proposed
PROMISE	Twin engineering model of the Mars rover Perseverance.						

== Mars ==
Mission	Rover	Country/Agency	Date of landing	Coordinates	Operational time	Distance travelled
Mars 2	PrOP-M	(Soviet Union) USSR	27 November 1971	45°S 47°E	-	-
Mars 2	First rover to reach Mars. Lost when Mars 2 landing system crash landed on Mars.					
Mars 3	PrOP-M	(Soviet Union) USSR	2 December 1971	45°S 202°E	-	-
Mars 3	The lander stopped communicating about 110 seconds after landing, before the rover was deployed.					
Mars Pathfinder	Sojourner	(United States) NASA	4 July 1997	38.2378°N 35.0017°W	85 days	100 m (330 ft)
Mars Pathfinder	First rover to successfully run on Mars.					
Mars Exploration Rover	Spirit	(United States) NASA	4 January 2004	14.5684°S 175.472636°E	6 years 79 days	7.73 km (4.80 mi)
Mars Exploration Rover	Mission ended after rover got stuck in Martian sand.					
Mars Exploration Rover	Opportunity	(United States) NASA	25 January 2004	1.9462°S 354.4734°E	14 years 140 days	45.16 km (28.06 mi)
Mars Exploration Rover	Longest distance travelled by any rover and most days operated.					
Mars Science Laboratory	Curiosity	(United States) NASA	6 August 2012	4.5895°S 137.4417°E	14 years 101 days	37.26 km (23.15 mi) as of 30 June 2026
Mars Science Laboratory	Rover for investigating past and present habitability, climate and geology.					
Mars 2020	Perseverance	(United States) NASA	18 February 2021	18.4447°N 77.4508°E	5 years 269 days	43.18 km (26.83 mi) as of 30 June 2026
Mars 2020	Ingenuity	(United States) NASA	3 April 2021 (deployment)	18.4447°N 77.4508°E	2 years 340 days	17.242 km (10.714 mi) in 72 flights
Mars 2020	The Ingenuity helicopter is the first aircraft to fly on an extraterrestrial body.					
Tianwen-1	Zhurong	(China) CNSA	14 May 2021	25.1°N 109.9°E	356 days	1.921 km (1.194 mi) as of 1 May 2022
Tianwen-1	Inactive after dust storm and Martian winter.					
MMX	Idefix	(France) (Germany) CNES/DLR	2027	TBD		
MMX	Rover for studying the surface of Phobos.					

== Asteroids ==
Body	Mission	Rover	Country/Agency	Date of landing	Location	Operational time	Distance travelled
162173 Ryugu	Hayabusa2	MINERVA-II Rover-1A	(Japan) JAXA	21 September 2019	Tritonis	36 days	
162173 Ryugu	Hayabusa2	MINERVA-II Rover-1B	(Japan) JAXA	21 September 2019	Tritonis	3 days	
162173 Ryugu	Hayabusa2	Successfully landed, returned images, and hopped along surface. First rovers on an asteroid.					
162173 Ryugu	Hayabusa2	MASCOT	(Germany) (France) DLR/CNES	3 October 2018	Alice's Wonderland	17 h 14 min	~17.9 m (59 ft)
162173 Ryugu	Hayabusa2	Successfully landed, returned images from the surface, and performed multiple hops along surface.					
162173 Ryugu	Hayabusa2	MINERVA-II Rover-2	(Japan) JAXA	October 2019	Unknown	0 days	0 m
162173 Ryugu	Hayabusa2	Failed before deployment, so it was released into orbit around the asteroid to perform gravitational measurements before it impacted a few days later.					

== Titan ==
Mission	Rover	Country/Agency	Date of landing	Location	Operational time	Distance travelled
Dragonfly		(United States) NASA	2034	Shangri-La	10 years (planned)	
Dragonfly		Rotorcraft to be sent to Titan between 5 and 25 July 2028.				

== Crewed rovers ==
Mission	Rover	Country/Agency	Date of landing	Coordinates	Operational time	Distance travelled	Notes
Apollo 15	Lunar Roving Vehicle	(United States) NASA	7 August 1971	26.1322°N 3.6339°E	3 h 02 min	27.76 km (7.75 mi)	First crewed lunar rover
Apollo 16	Lunar Roving Vehicle	(United States) NASA	21 April 1972	8.97301°S 15.50019°E	3 h 26 min	26.55 km (16.50 mi)	
Apollo 17	Lunar Roving Vehicle	(United States) NASA	11 December 1972	20.1908°N 30.7717°E	4 h 26 min	35.89 km (22.30 mi)	Furthest distance travelled by crewed lunar rover
Artemis V	Lunar Terrain Vehicle	(United States) NASA	2030	TBD			Unpressurised crewed rover for the Artemis program
Chinese Crewed Lunar Mission	Chinese Crewed Rover	(China) CNSA	2030	TBD			Rover shown at the National Museum of China on 24 February 2023
Artemis VII	Lunar Cruiser	(Japan) JAXA	2032	TBD			Developed jointly between JAXA and Toyota

== Proposed rovers ==
Rover	Country/Agency	Proposed Date of launched	Location	Notes
MPR-1	(Canada) STELLS	2025	In range of a crater	Rover under study for power supply for future mining rovers
Canadensys Rover	(Canada) Canadensys	2026	Lunar South Pole	Rover funded by CSA to scout for water ice on the Moon
Lunar Trailblazer	(Australia) (Netherlands) Delft University of Technology	2026	Lunar South Pole	Small rover studying swarm technologies
Luna-Grunt	(Russia) Roscosmos	2028		Rover for proposed Luna 29 sample return mission, details of rover are unknown
LIBER	(Singapore) Qosmosys	2027	TBD	Lunar Integrated Bulk Extraction Rover (LIBER) will mine on the lunar surface.
ExoMars Rosalind Franklin	(Europe) ESA	NET 2028	18.275°N 335.368°E	Rover will search for previous signs of life on Mars.
HERACLES	(Canada) CSA	2030	Schrödinger basin	Part of European Large Logistic Lander program, will be used to transport samples and scout for resources on the Moon.
Asagumo	(United Kingdom) Spacebit	TBD		Spider-like rover was planned to launch with Peregrine Mission One but its status is currently unknown
CELV	(China) Jilin University/CAST	TBD	Near a Lunar base	The Cubic Emergency Lunar Vehicle is an emergency crewed rover that will be stored on a larger crewed rover.
MoonRanger	(United States) Astrobotic/Carnegie Mellon University	TBD	Lunar South Pole	Was intended to launch in November 2023 but lunar lander provider Masten Space Systems declared bankruptcy and the rover is on hold
Rashid 2	(United Arab Emirates) MBRSC	TBD	TBD	Rover development announced after failure of first rover.

== See also ==
- List of landings on extraterrestrial bodies
- List of extraterrestrial orbiters
- List of Solar System probes
