= Melba Roy Mouton =

American mathematician (1929–1990)

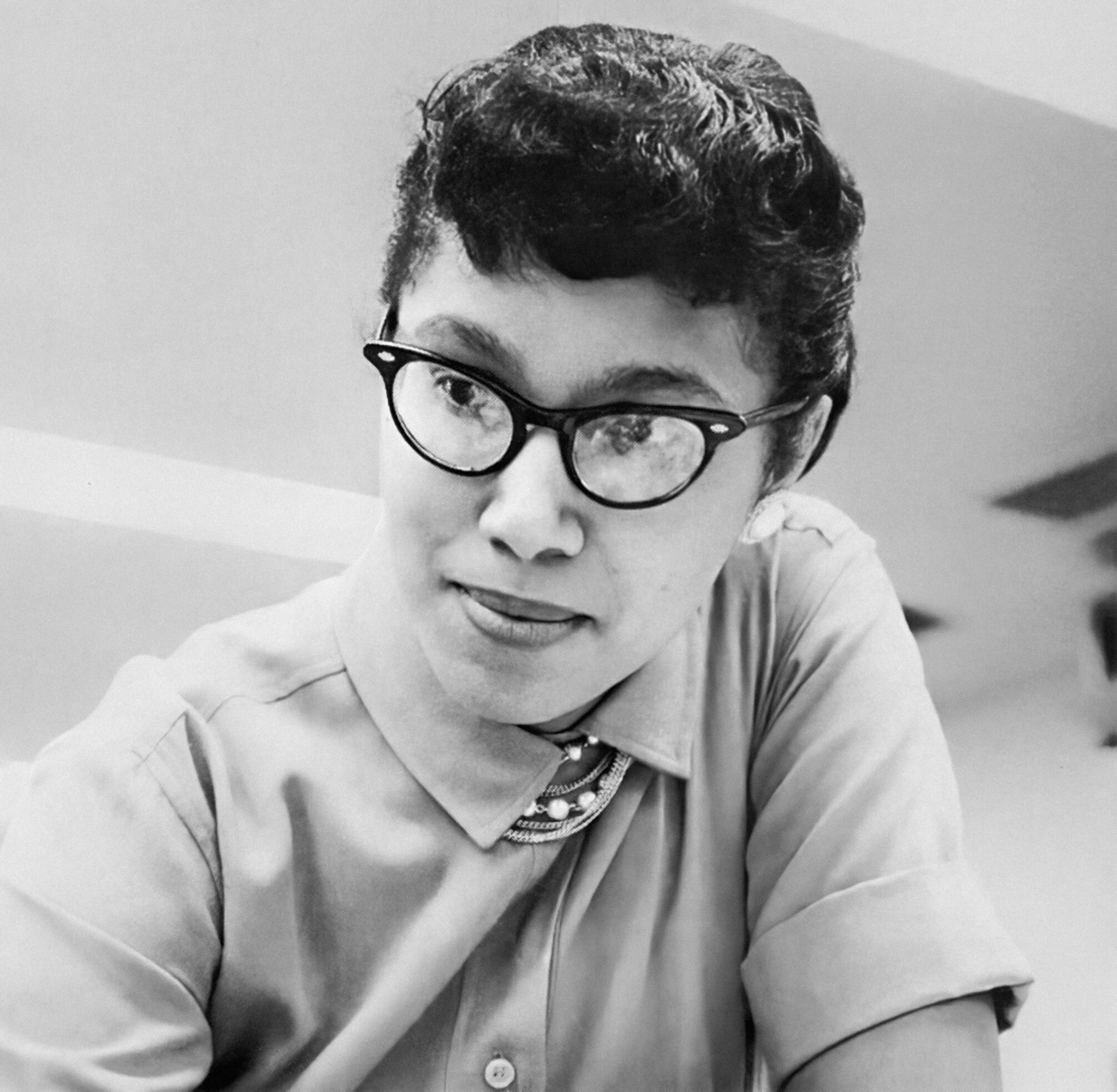
- Melba Roy in 1960
- Born: April 28, 1929; Fairfax, Virginia
- Died: June 25, 1990 (aged 61); Silver Spring, Maryland
- Education: Howard University
- Awards: Apollo Achievement Award, NASA Exceptional Performance Award
- Scientific career
- Workplaces: United States Census Bureau, Army Map Service, Goddard Space Flight Center

Melba Roy Mouton (April 28, 1929 – June 25, 1990) was an African American mathematician who served as Assistant Chief of Research Programs at NASA's Trajectory and Geodynamics Division in the 1960s and headed a group of NASA mathematicians called "computers". She served as Head Mathematician for Echo Satellites 1 and 2 before becoming Head Computer Programmer and then Program Production Section Chief at Goddard Space Flight Center.

== Early life and education ==
Melba Louise Chloe was born in 1929, in Fairfax, Virginia, to Rhodie and Edna Chloe (née Robinson). She graduated from Howard University in 1950 with a master's degree in mathematics, after receiving a bachelor's degree in mathematics with a minor in physics.

While at Howard, Mouton was president of the Kelly Miller Chapter of Future Teachers of America, a member of the NAACP, the Mathematics Club, and the Delta Sigma Theta sorority. She was on the Dean's Honor Roll for four years, and was selected for the 1949–1950 Who’s Who among Students in American Universities and Colleges.

== Career ==
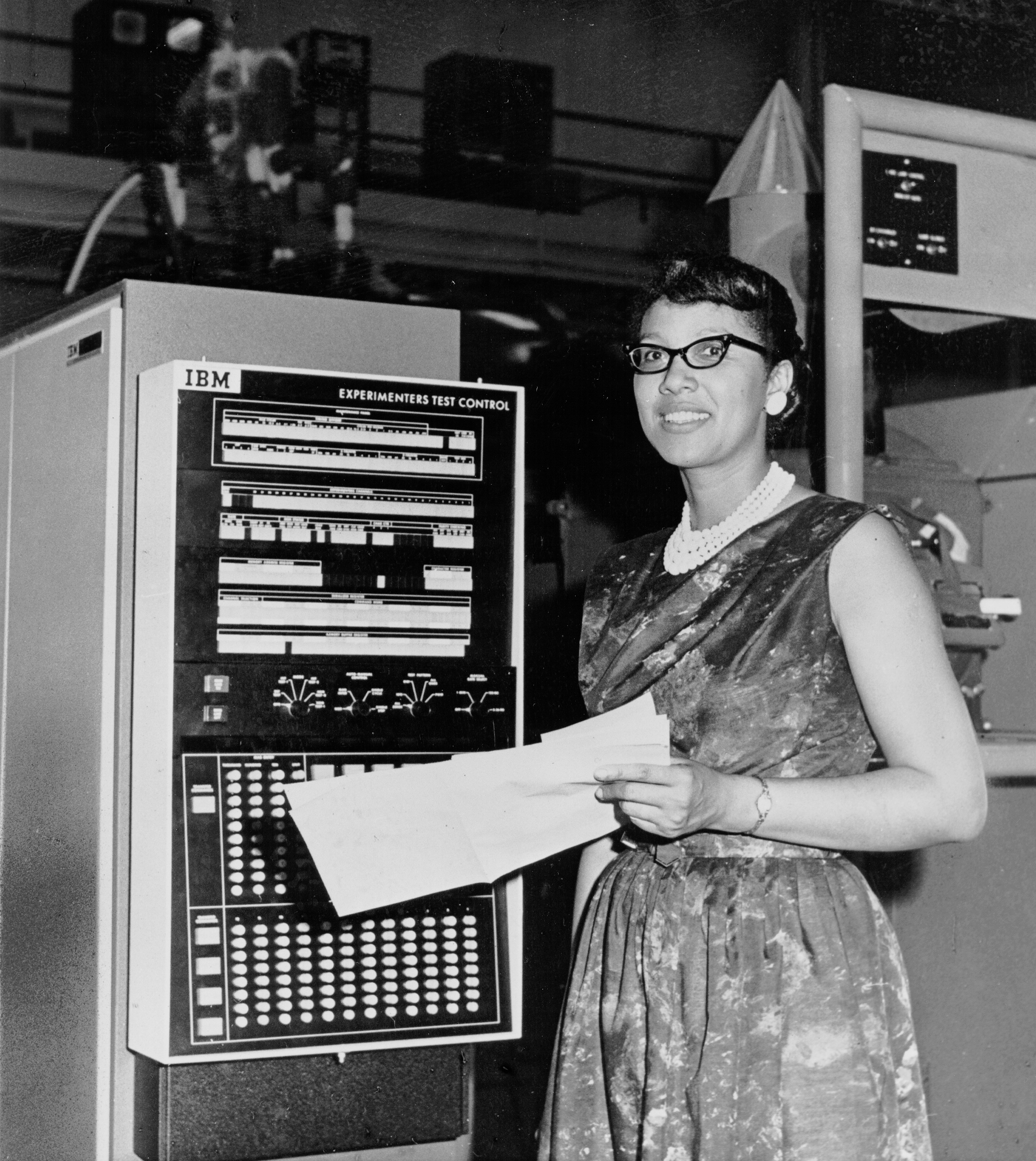
Melba Roy - Female Computer at NASA 1964

After working in statistical analysis for the Army Map Service and the Census Bureau for four years, Mouton started working for NASA in 1959. After Echo 1 was put into orbit the following year, she led a team of NASA mathematicians (known as "computers") in tracking its orbit.

At Goddard, Mouton taught a series of seminars on A Programming Language at Watson Research Labs. In a NASA symposium, she published a paper about the importance of investing in thorough, descriptive program documentation for projects which are to be maintainable over time.

She was also featured alongside some African American colleagues in an advertisement in the Afro American designed to spotlight NASA's diversity. Mouton received an Apollo Achievement Award and an Exceptional Performance Award from NASA before she retired in 1973.

== Personal life ==
Mouton had three children and was married twice, first to Wardell Roy and later to Webster Mouton. She died in Silver Spring, Maryland, on June 25, 1990, of a brain tumor at the age of 61.

== Commemoration ==
In May 2022, lunar mountain Mons Mouton (previously known informally as Leibnitz Beta of the Leibnitz plateau) at the lunar south polar region was named in her honor. It was to be the landing site of the Volatiles Investigating Polar Exploration Rover (VIPER) before the mission was cancelled in 2024. The mountain was the landing site of the Intuitive Machines lander mission IM-2 and is to be the landing site of the Astrobotic Griffin lander carrying the Astrolab FLIP rover in 2025.

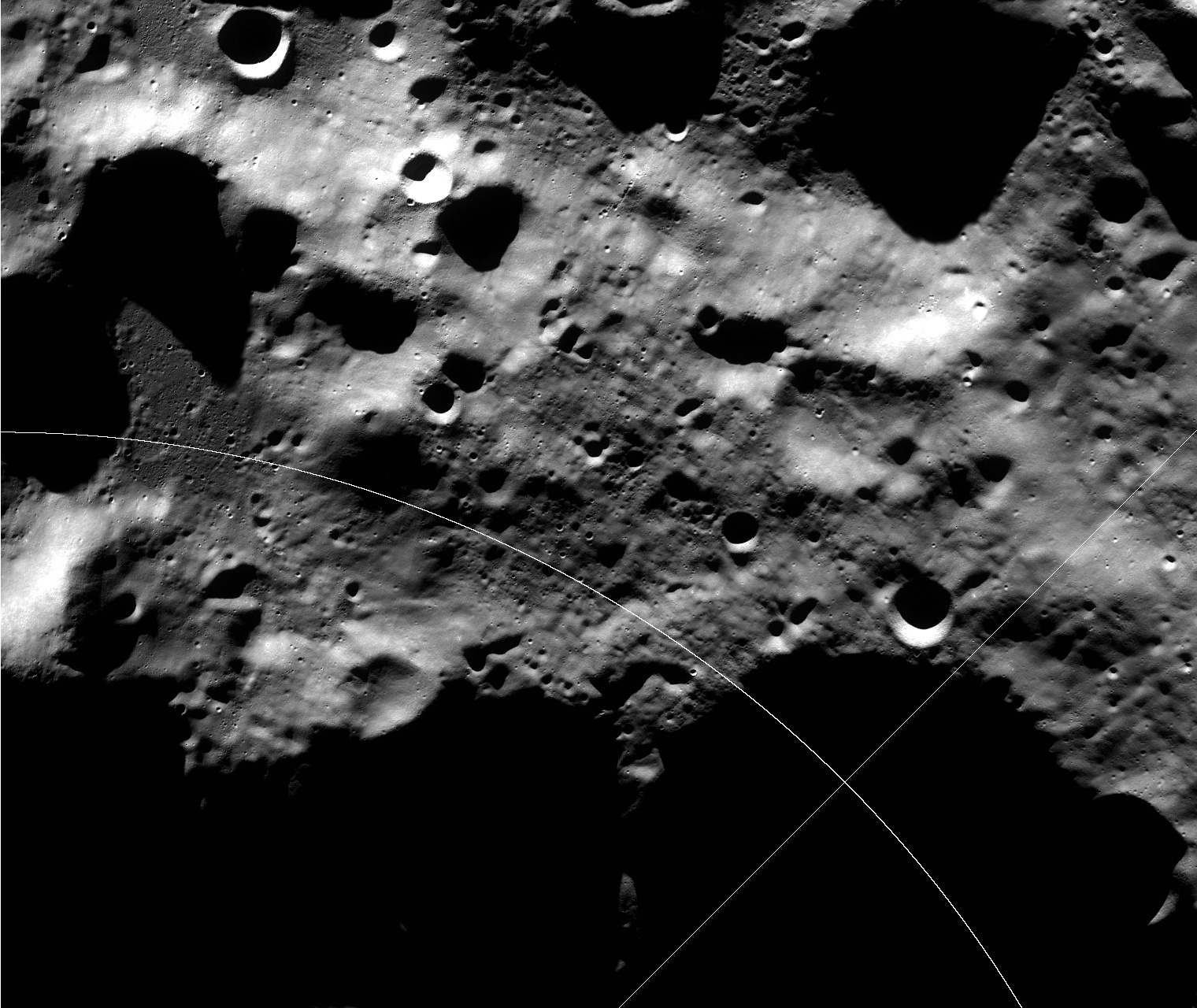
Mons Mouton, near the lunar south pole: LRO Wide Angle Camera mosaic

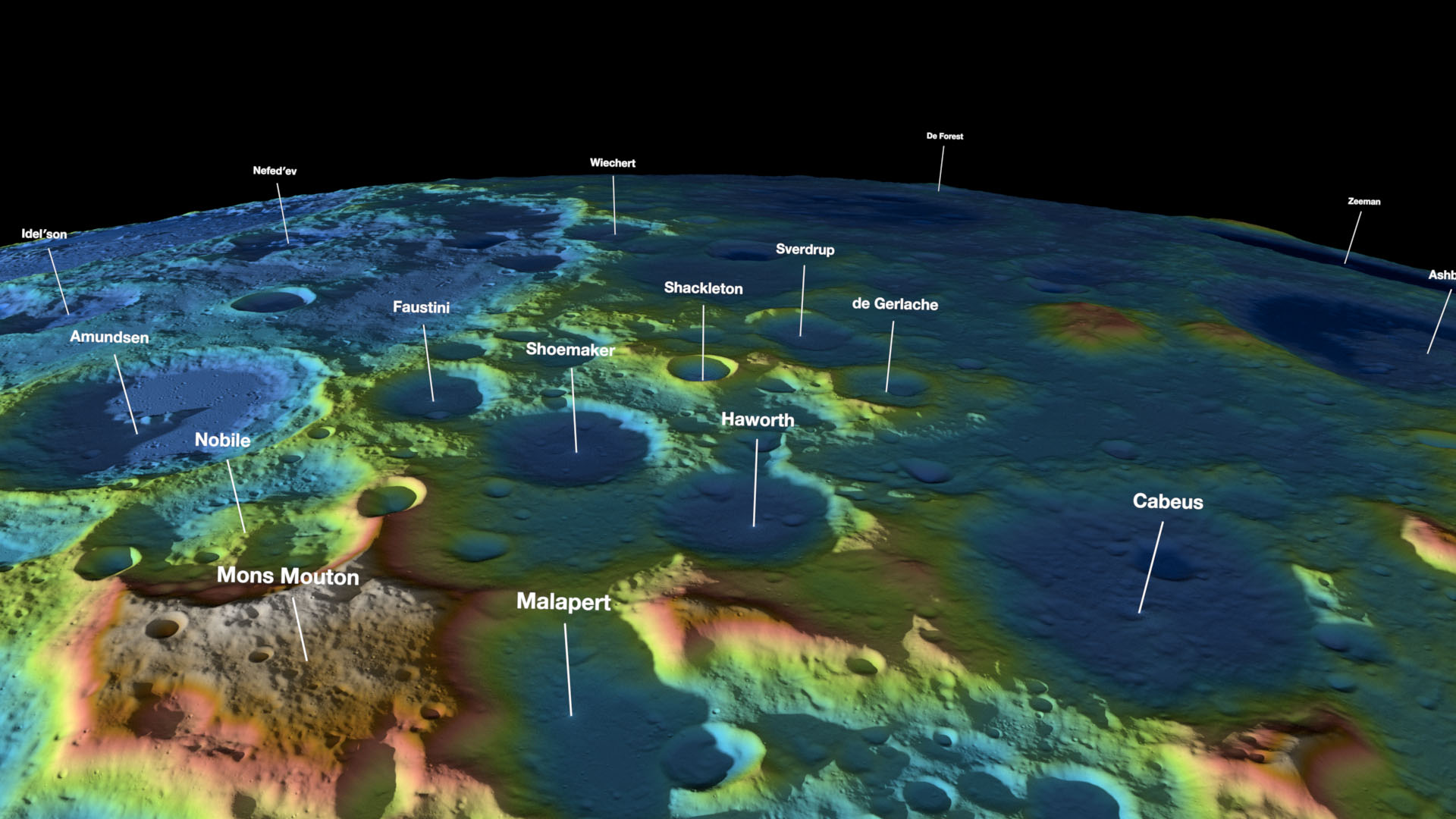
Mons Mouton is in lower left of this oblique view incorporating topography

Proposed landing site of VIPER
