= Griffin Mission One =

Lunar lander built by Astrobotic Technology

- Griffin-1 undergoing environmental testing at JPL
- Names: CLPS TO 20A; Moon Base II; Griffin-1
- Mission type: Moon landing
- Operator: Astrobotic Technology

Spacecraft properties
- Spacecraft: Griffin

Start of mission
- Launch date: January 2027 (planned)
- Rocket: Falcon Heavy
- Launch site: KSC, LC-39A

End of mission
- Decay date

Moon lander
- Landing date: TBA
- Griffin Mission One mission patch Astrobotic Technology Commercial Lunar Payload Services

Griffin Mission One (also referred to as Griffin-1) is a robotic lunar lander mission developed by Astrobotic Technology as part of NASA's Commercial Lunar Payload Services (CLPS) program. It is scheduled for launch in early 2027. The mission aims to deliver a suite of scientific, technological, and cultural payloads to the Lunar south pole region, specifically targeting the Nobile Crater region near Mons Mouton.

== Overview ==
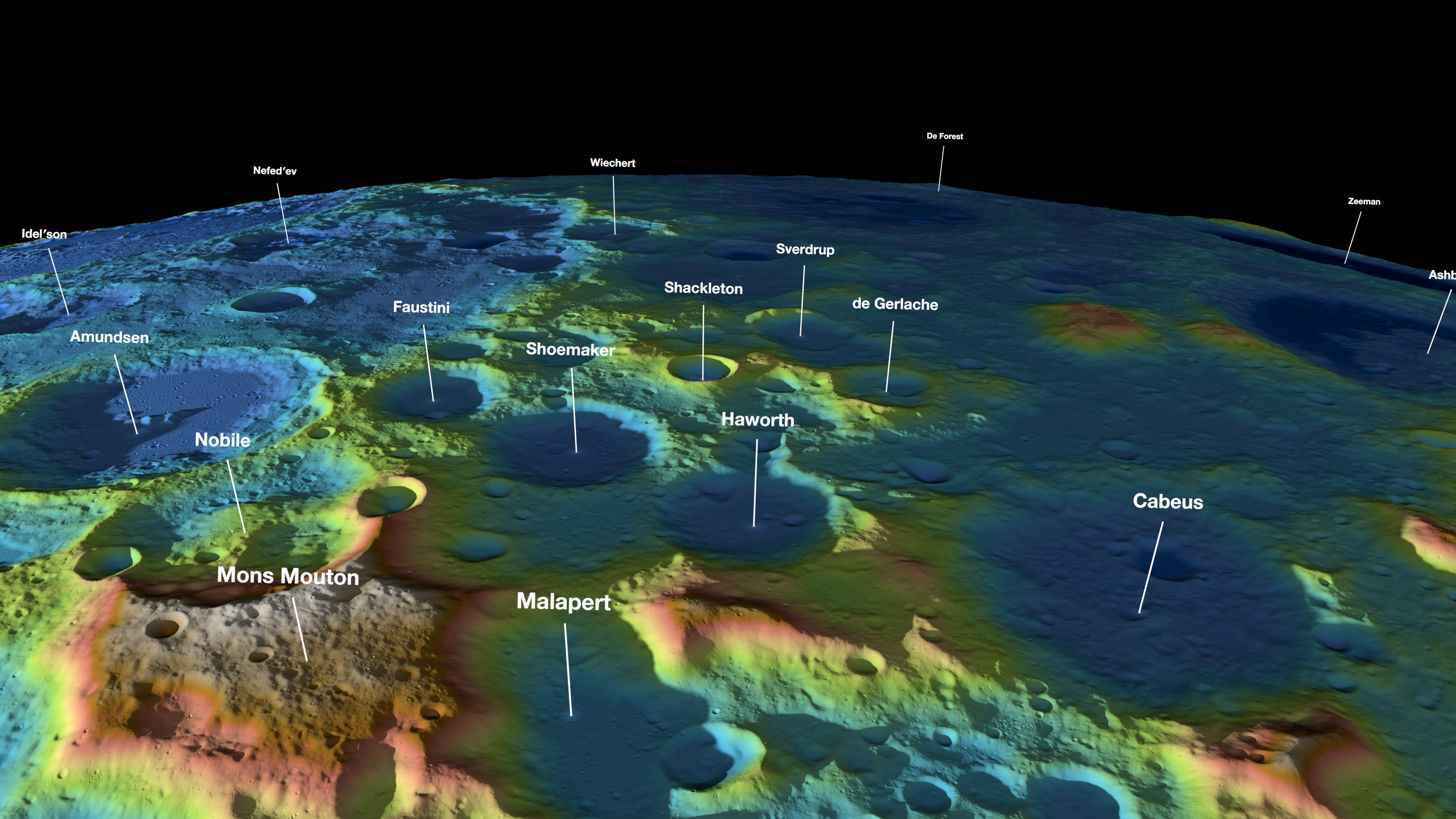
Nobile crater near the Lunar south pole

Griffin-1 is an Infrastructure class lander, planned to land the largest commercial payload so far delivered to the lunar surface, delivering over 445 kg (981 lb) of equipment, a rover, and other cargo to Nobile crater near the lunar south pole. The mission is a part of the NASA Commercial Lunar Payload Services program, which is intended to support the Artemis program aimed at human missions to the moon.

The mission will launch aboard a SpaceX Falcon Heavy rocket from Launch Complex 39A at Kennedy Space Center, Florida, no earlier than January 2027. The Griffin lander, a 1,265 kg (2,789 lb) infrastructure-class lander, is equipped with advanced autonomous navigation and hazard avoidance systems for landing in rugged terrain.

Griffin-1 was given the designation 'Moon base II' by NASA early in 2026, which it will be referred to as once it has landed, forming part of a wider NASA moon base project. The mission is designed to conduct experiments and technology demonstrations focused on lunar resource prospecting, future human presence, volatile characterization, and surface operations in the rugged terrain of the Lunar south pole.

== Payloads ==
Griffin-1 carries science and cultural payloads from NASA, ESA, and other partners:

- FLIP rover: a 500 kg (1,100 lb) rover built by Astrolab capable of carrying 30 kg (66 lb) of additional payloads, FLIP (FLEX Lunar Innovation Platform) is designed as a precursor to their FLEX (Flexible Logistics and Exploration) rover.
- CubeRover: a 2U-sized mobile rover by Astrobotic, designed for mobility demonstrations, capable of traversing several kilometers and recharging via solar panels.
- LandCam-X: an optical navigation camera developed by OIP Space Instruments in Belgium for ESA's Terrae Novae program. Its goal is to capture high-resolution imagery of the Moon's surface during the lander's orbit and descent. These images will be later combined with Griffin's telemetry to improve vision-based navigation software.
- Nanofiche GLPH (Galactic Library Preserve Humanity): a durable nanoscale archive etched on nickel, containing cultural and intellectual records, including literature, art, music, and historical documents. It is designed to endure lunar conditions for millions of years.

== History ==
In 2020, the mission was selected to carry NASA's Volatiles Investigating Polar Exploration Rover (VIPER), but following VIPER's cancellation in July 2024, it was reconfigured with alternative payloads while retaining its CLPS task order. In September 2022, ESA selected the mission to carry the LandCam-X experimental navigation camera. On 26 May 2026, NASA officially designated the mission as Moon Base II.

On 15 June 2026, Astrobotic unveiled the lander, calling it "the first infrastructure-class lander going to the surface of the Moon". In September 2026, NASA expected Griffin-1 to be the only CLPS mission launching in 2026, as both Blue Moon Pathfinder Mission 1 and IM-3 were delayed to 2027. On 13 October 2026, the lander concluded its environmental tests at JPL.

In October 2026, Voyager Technologies expected the lander to launch before the end of 2026 and NASA expected the launch before the end of 2026 or in January 2027. In November 2026, Voyager Technologies expected the mission's launch to take place in January 2027.

== Gallery ==
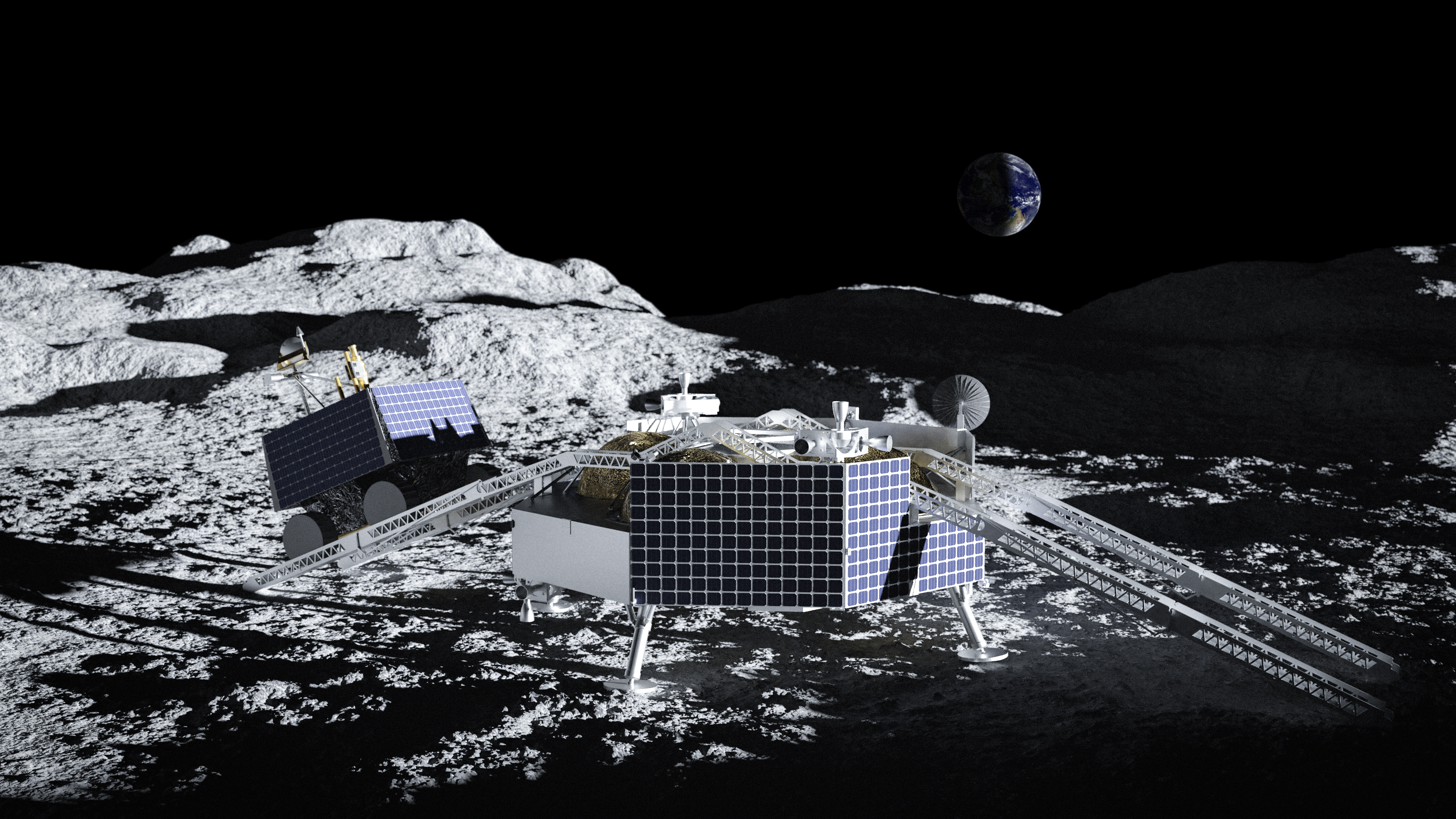
Artist's rendering of Griffin deploying VIPER

Artist's rendering of Griffin-1 on the Moon

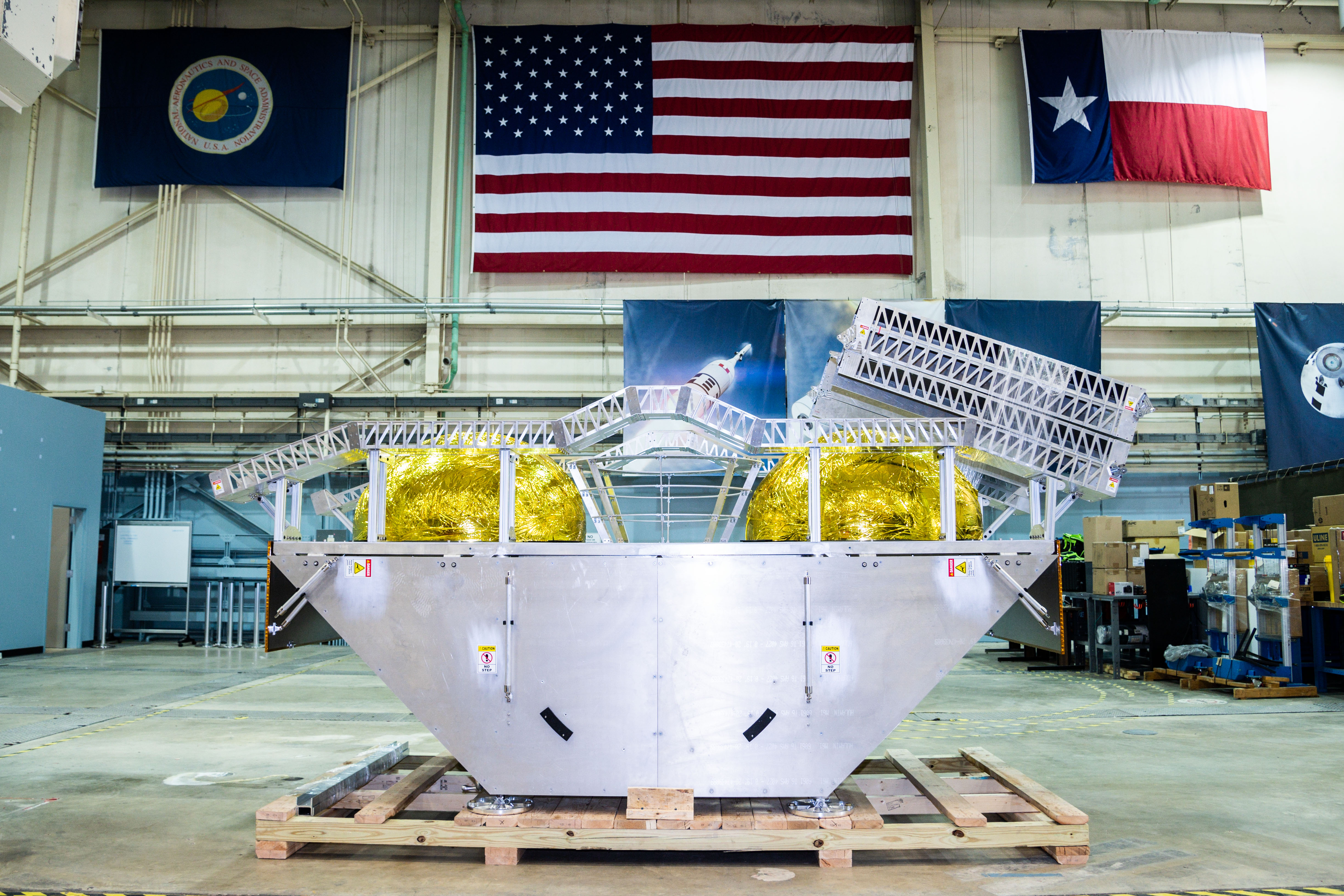
Mockup analog of Griffin for testing VIPER deployment, 2021

Astrobotic's CubeRover, 2022

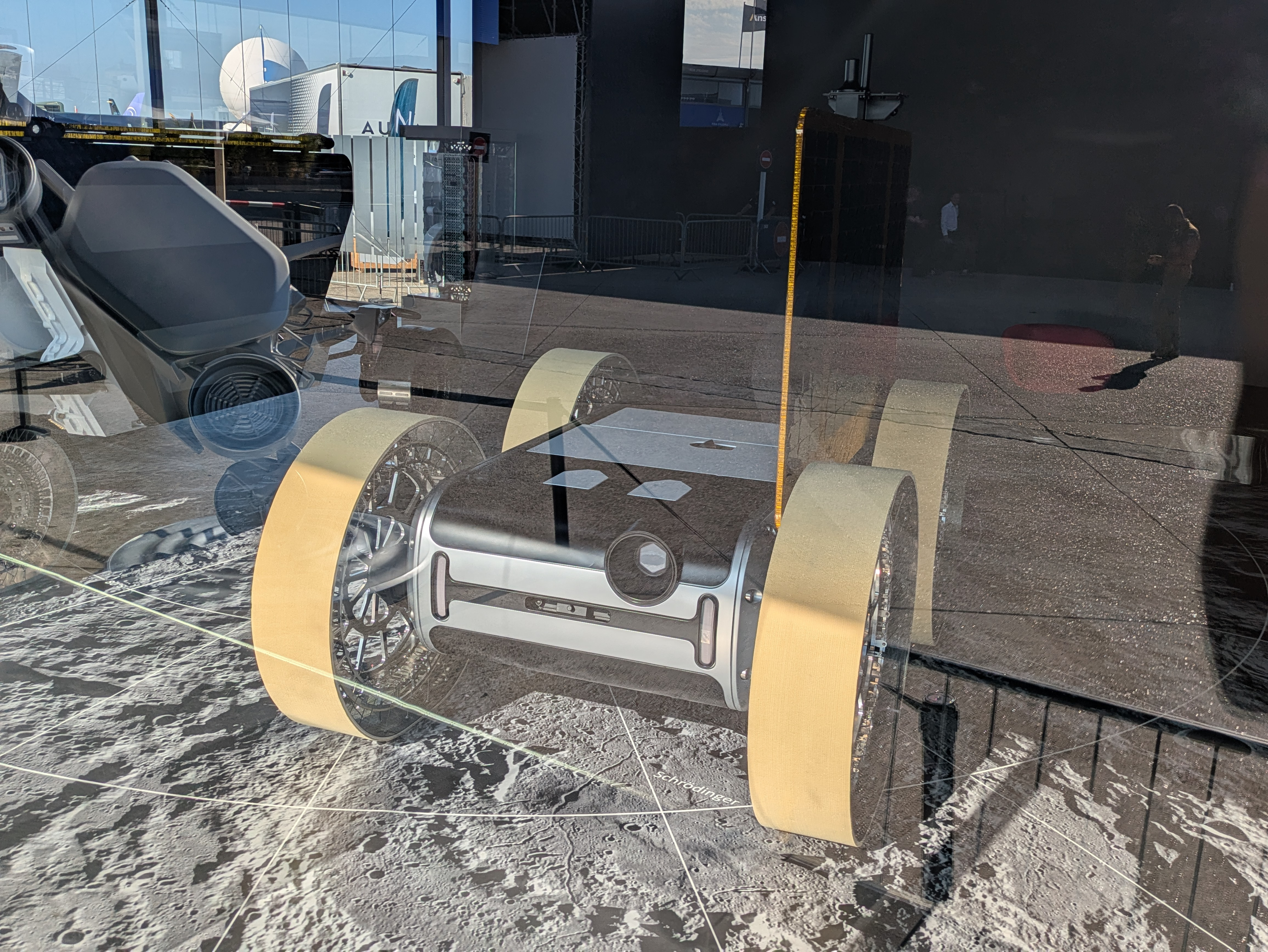
Astrolab's FLIP rover, 2025

Griffin-1 undergoing environmental testing at JPL, 2026

Griffin-1 undergoing environmental testing at JPL, 2026

Griffin-1 undergoing environmental testing at JPL, 2026

Griffin-1 undergoing environmental testing at JPL, 2026

Griffin-1 undergoing environmental testing at JPL, 2026
