= Nobile (crater) =

Lunar surface depression

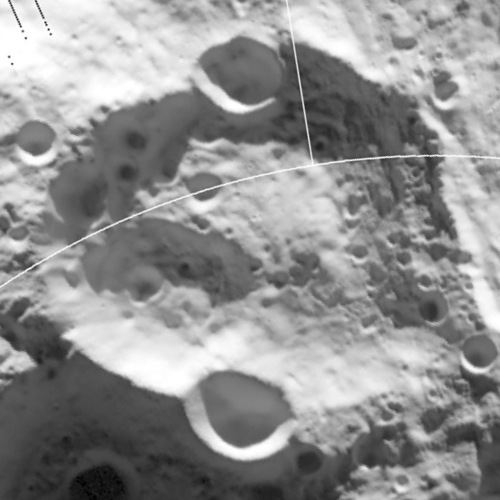
- Nobile Crater imaged by Diviner, NASA
- Coordinates: 85.28°S 53.27°E
- Diameter: 79.27 km (49.26 mi)
- Depth: Unknown
- Colongitude: 323° at sunrise
- Eponym: Umberto Nobile

Nobile is a lunar impact crater that is located near the southern pole of the Moon. It was named after the Italian aviator and explorer Umberto Nobile by the International Astronomical Union (IAU) in 1994. It lies to the south of the crater Scott, along the western rim of Amundsen. Between Nobile and the southern pole lie the smaller craters Shoemaker and Faustini.

== Names ==
Nobile was previously designated Scott A before being assigned a name by the IAU. In November 2021, the IAU named the small crater Stose (16.7 km diameter), located to the southwest of Nobile. In August 2023, the IAU named two other small craters near Nobile. One is Burbidge (21 km diameter), located on the south rim of Nobile. The other crater is Floss (9 km diameter), located near the northwest rim of Nobile.

== Description ==
This is an eroded crater formation that is almost constantly cloaked in deep shadows. When sunlight does enter the interior of this crater, it does so at a very oblique angle. The crater rim is overlaid by several lesser craters, the most notable being a formation about half the diameter of Nobile along the western rim. There are also small craters along the southwest and northern parts of the rim. The outer rampart of Amundsen overlies the eastern rim and inner wall. The interior floor of this crater is somewhat irregular, and there are a few small craterlets across the surface.

== Exploration ==
On 20 September 2021, NASA selected the western edge of Nobile, Mons Mouton, as the landing site for the VIPER mission, set to arrive in November 2024. This mission was later cancelled in 2024 due to cost overruns. As of October 2026 Griffin Mission One is scheduled to land near Nobile in 2027 with a different payload including the Astrolab FLIP rover.

== Gallery ==
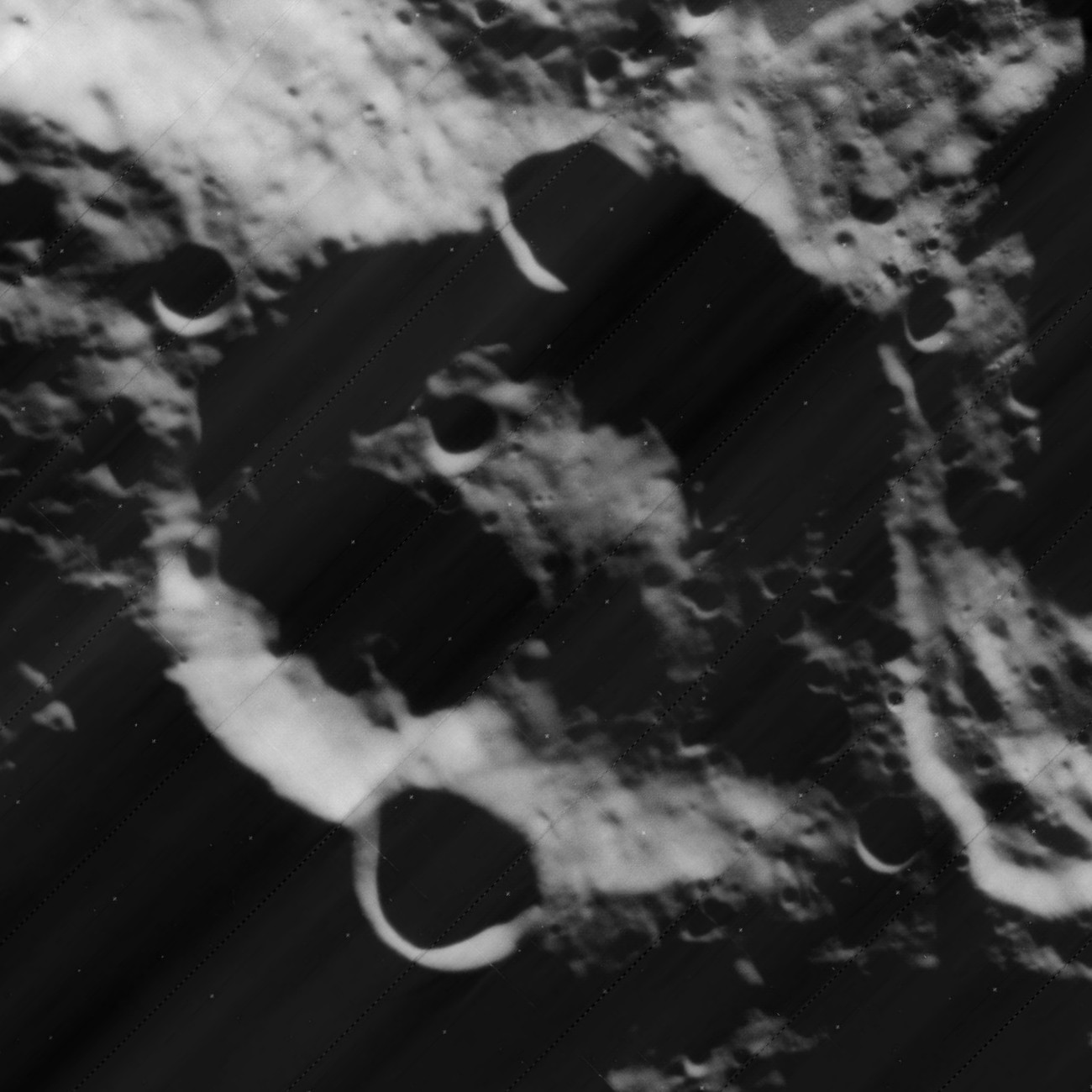
Lunar Orbiter 4 image with north at top

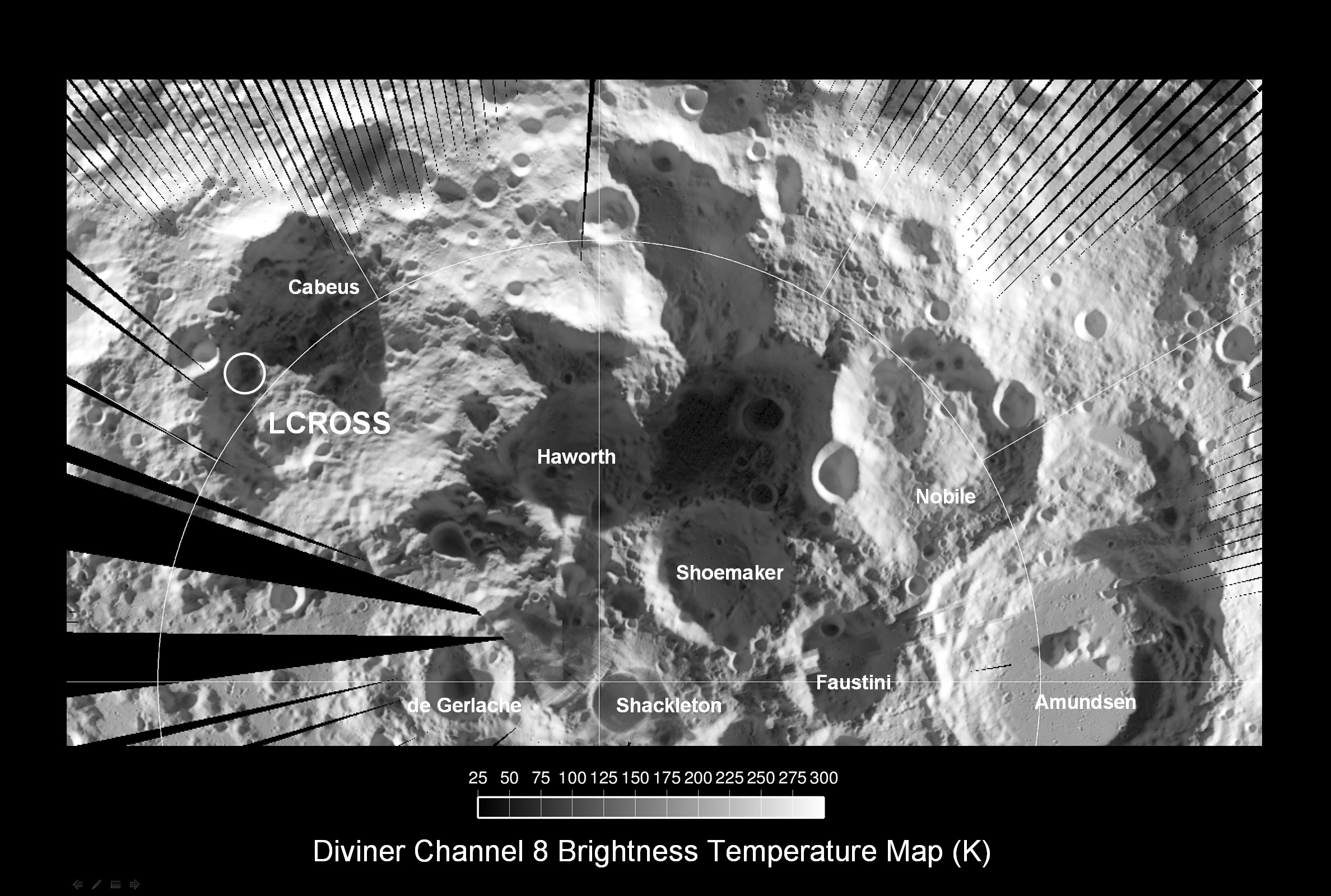
Lunar south pole as imaged by Diviner.

The west rim of Nobile, Mons Mouton, is the proposed VIPER landing site.
