= Mons Mouton =

Plateau near the Moon's south pole

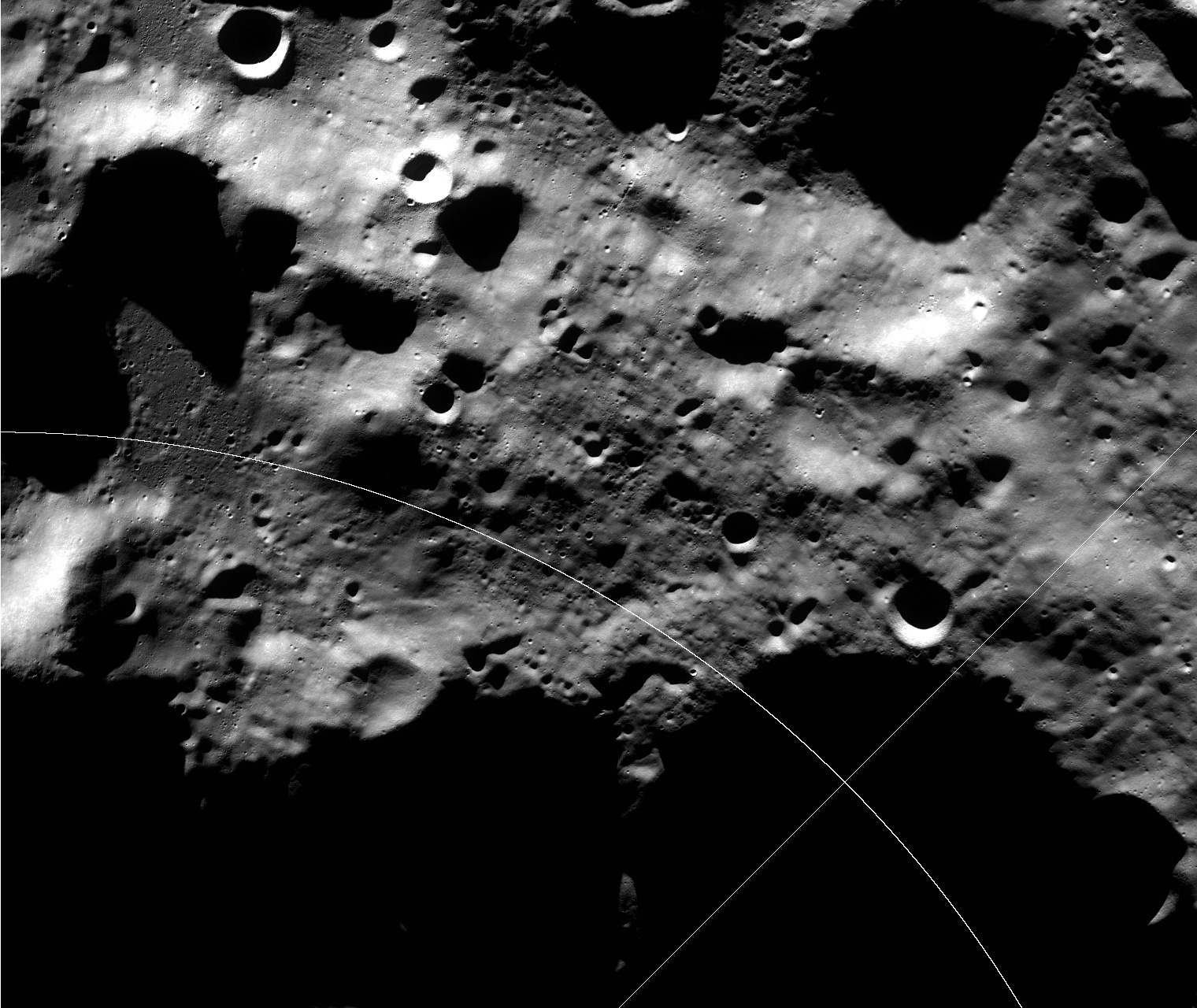
- LRO Wide Angle Camera mosaic

Highest point
- Listing: Lunar mountains
- Coordinates: 84.6°S 31.0°E

Naming
- Etymology: Named for Melba Roy Mouton
- English translation: Mouton Mountain
- Language of name: Latin

Geography
- Location: the Moon

Mons Mouton is the Moon's tallest mountain that has been officially named. The base to peak height of this flat-topped mountain is 6 km (3.7 mi) per altimetry data from the Lunar Reconnaissance Orbiter. It is just under 100 km (62 mi) wide and lies between the craters Nobile and Malapert, within 6° of the lunar South Pole on the Moon's near-side. This is a region of special interest because of the presence of Permanently Shadowed Regions (PSRs) that could be cold traps for water, together with areas of extended solar illumination in their proximity.

Mons Mouton is possibly a remnant of the rim of the South Pole–Aitken basin - one of the oldest, largest and deepest impact craters in the Solar System. There are taller mountains than Mons Mouton on the Moon's far-side which are also likely part of this basin's rings, but they are as yet unnamed.

Mons Mouton was previously sometimes referred to as Leibnitz Beta, but was named on 13 May 2022 after the American mathematician Melba Roy Mouton.

== Exploration ==
The mountain was subsequently chosen as the landing site for the IM-2 Athena lunar lander. IM-2 landed on 6 March 2025 at 84.7906°S 29.1957°E. The spacecraft was intact after touchdown but resting on its side, thereby complicating its planned science and technology demonstration mission; this outcome is similar to what occurred with the company's IM-1 Odysseus spacecraft in 2024. On 13 March, Intuitive Machines shared that, like on the IM-1 mission, the Athena's altimeter had failed during landing, leaving its onboard computer without an accurate altitude reading. As a result, the spacecraft struck a plateau, tipped over, and skidded across the lunar surface, rolling once or twice before settling inside the crater. The company's CEO compared it to a baseball player sliding into a base. During the slide, the spacecraft rolled once or twice, before coming to rest inside the crater. The impact also kicked up regolith that coated the solar panels in dust, further degrading their performance.

The Griffin-1 mission plans to land at Nubile crater near Mons mouton in 2027, and deploy a rover.

The IM-4 mission plans to land at the plateau in 2027.

In 2025, China's Chang'e 8 plans to land at Leibnitz Beta in 2029.

In 2026, Mons Mouton has also been studied as a potential landing region for India’s Chandrayaan-4 sample-return mission.

== Gallery ==
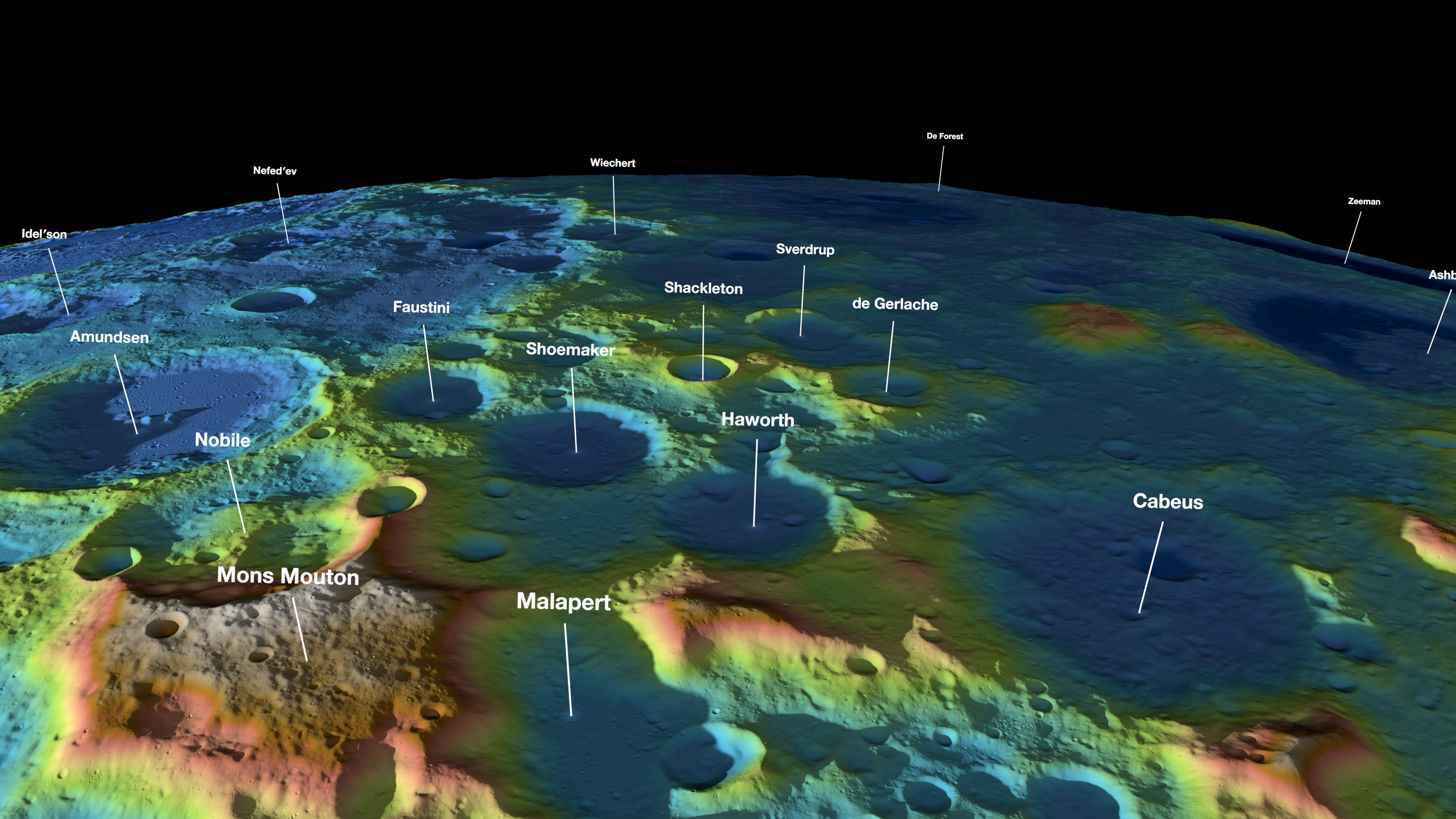
Mons Mouton is in lower left of this oblique view incorporating topography

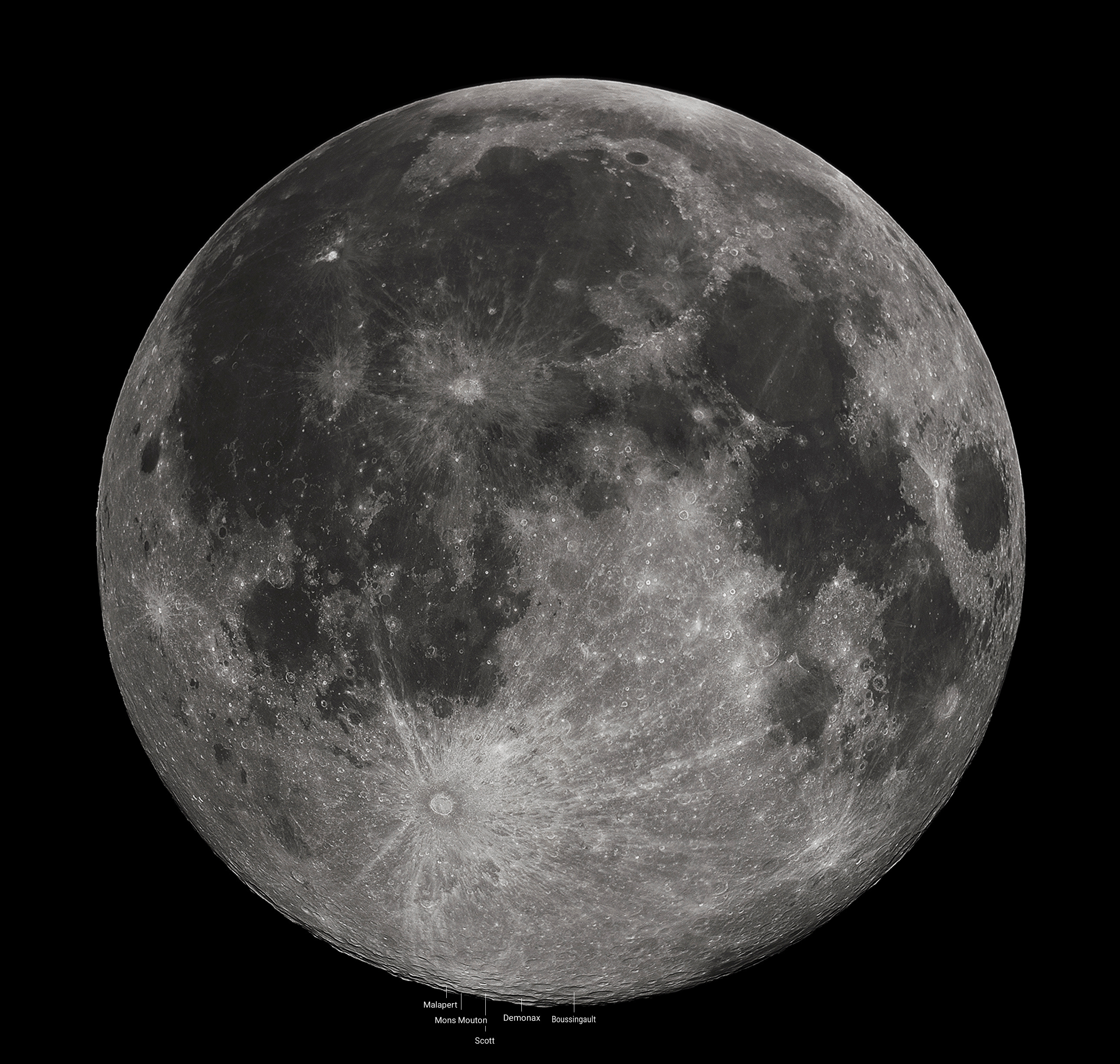
Mons Mouton as viewed from Earth

== See also ==
- Mount Everest
- Olympus Mons
