= FLIP (rover) =

Lunar rover

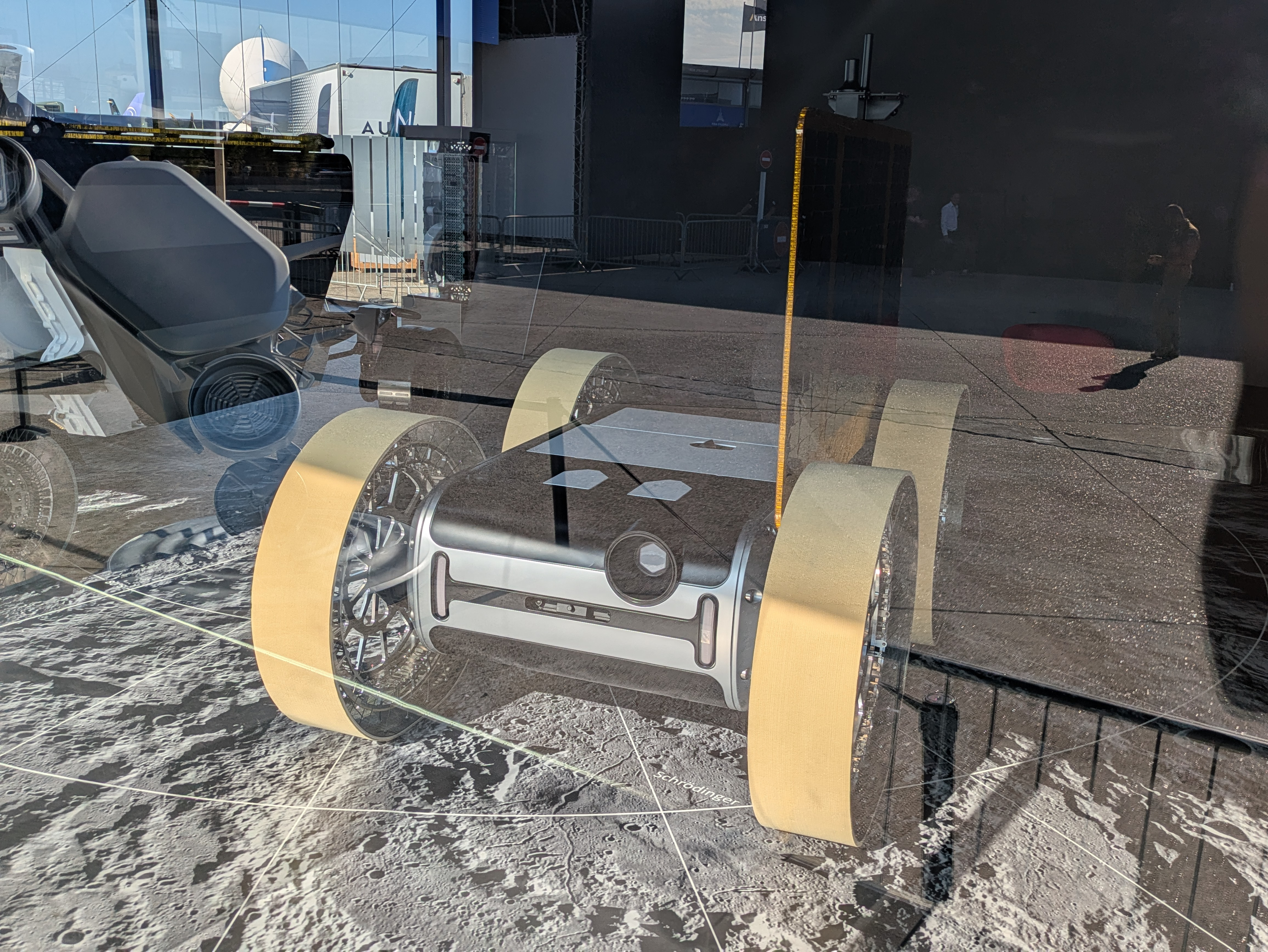
- Mission type: Lunar rover
- Operator: NASA
- Website: https://www.astrolab.space/flip-rover/

Spacecraft properties
- Manufacturer: Astrolab
- Launch mass: 500 kg (1,100 lb)
- Payload mass: 30 kg (66 lb)

Start of mission
- Launch date: January 2027 (planned)
- Rocket: Falcon Heavy
- Launch site: LC-39A, Kennedy Space Center
- Contractor: SpaceX

FLIP (FLEX Lunar Innovation Platform) is a planned 500 kg (1,100 lb) lunar rover capable of carrying 30 kg (66 lb) of scientific payloads, manufactured by Astrolab for NASA's CLPS programme. The rover has been designed as a precursor to Astrolab's FLEX (Flexible Logistics and Exploration) rover platform.

== History ==
After the initial cancellation of NASA's VIPER mission on Astrobotic's Griffin mission One in early 2024, Astrolab used the opportunity to reach the lunar surface by including the FLIP rover in the mission. This was conceived as a demonstration platform to gather essential data on lunar dust mitigation and surface operations, informing the design and functionality of future lunar logistics platforms and prove critical subsystems such as avionics, autonomous navigation, and power systems for the larger FLEX rover.

In August 2025 Interlune indicated the FLIP rover would carry a multispectral camera they designed to search for helium-3 on the Moon. FLIP will also carry a computer payload delivered by HPE. In December 2025 Florida Media Now announced a delay of FLIP, which was in, "thermal-vac and integrated functional tests." On 16 October 2026 Astrolab reported FLIP had completed testing.

FLIP is to launch as a CLPS payload on the Griffin Mission One. It is currently scheduled for launch by early 2027.

== See Also ==
- Pragyan
- Colmena
- Yutu-2
