= Colmena =

Mexican robotic lunar science experiment

The Colmena project (lit.Beehive) is a science and engineering experiment to design and deploy small autonomous robots to explore the surface of the Moon. It was created at the National Autonomous University of Mexico (UNAM) by the LINX Space Instrumentation Laboratory, at the UNAM Institute of Nuclear Sciences. It is the first Latin American scientific instrument designed to explore the surface of the Moon.

== Overview ==
The payload consisted of five small, autonomous robots, each weighing less than 60 grams (2.1 oz) and measuring 12 centimetres (4.7 in) in diameter, which are designed to be catapulted onto the lunar surface. Once the robots are on the surface, they locate each other and collaborate in a swarm to accomplish their science mission (thus the project name, which is Spanish for beehive).

It was launched on 8 January 2024 on the maiden flight of the Vulcan Centaur rocket as a co-hosted payload on Astrobotic Technology's Peregrine Mission One to the Moon. However, following a propellant issue with the lander, the mission was aborted and the lander along with Colmena burned up in Earth's atmosphere over the South Pacific Ocean, with a last reported contact by the Canberra tracking station at 20:59 GMT.

A replica of Colmena, along with models of the other payloads, is integrated into a repurposed test model of Astrobotic's Peregrine lunar lander, as part of the Futures in Space exhibition at the Smithsonian National Air and Space Museum in Washington, D.C.

== See Also ==
- Pragyan
- FLIP (rover)
