= Astrolab =

American aerospace company founded in 2020

- Trade name: Venturi Astrolab Inc.
- Type: Private
- Industry: Aerospace
- Incorporated: Delaware
- Founded: January 2020; 6 years ago
- Founder: Jaret B. Matthews
- Headquarters: Hawthorne, California, United States
- Key people: Jaret B. Matthews (CEO); Rius Billing (Chief Engineer)
- Services: Lunar surface mobility and logistics
- Website: astrolab.space

Astrolab, Inc., officially Venturi Astrolab Inc., is a private American aerospace company based in Hawthorne, California, that designs and develops robotic mobility systems for planetary exploration. Jaret B. Matthews, an aerospace engineer, founded Astrolab in January, 2020.

Astrolab develops commercial planetary surface mobility vehicles specialized in surface logistics for the Moon and Mars, with its flagship rover platform, the Flexible Logistics and Exploration (FLEX) rover, aimed at enabling scalable surface operations and infrastructure development. The company was awarded a contract to develop NASA's Lunar Terrain Vehicle in 2024. Astrolab planned to send their first rover to the Moon in 2025 on the Astrobotic Griffin 1 mission.

== History ==
Astrolab was co-founded by Jaret Matthews, a former engineer at NASA's Jet Propulsion Laboratory (JPL) and SpaceX, who envisioned a reusable, modular mobility system to support human and robotic activity beyond Earth. Co-led by Chief Engineer Rius Billing, the team includes former staff from NASA, SpaceX, Tesla, and other major aerospace firms. In 2021, the company moved into its Hawthorne headquarters, near SpaceX, and began terrestrial field testing of its rover platforms. The company exited stealth in March 2022 and secured a contract in 2023 for the first commercial FLEX rover mission, scheduled to be delivered to the Moon as early as December 2026 aboard a SpaceX Starship. In April 2024, NASA awarded Astrolab a contract under the Lunar Terrain Vehicle Services (LTVS) program to advance lunar mobility for future Artemis missions.

== Technology ==
=== FLEX rover ===
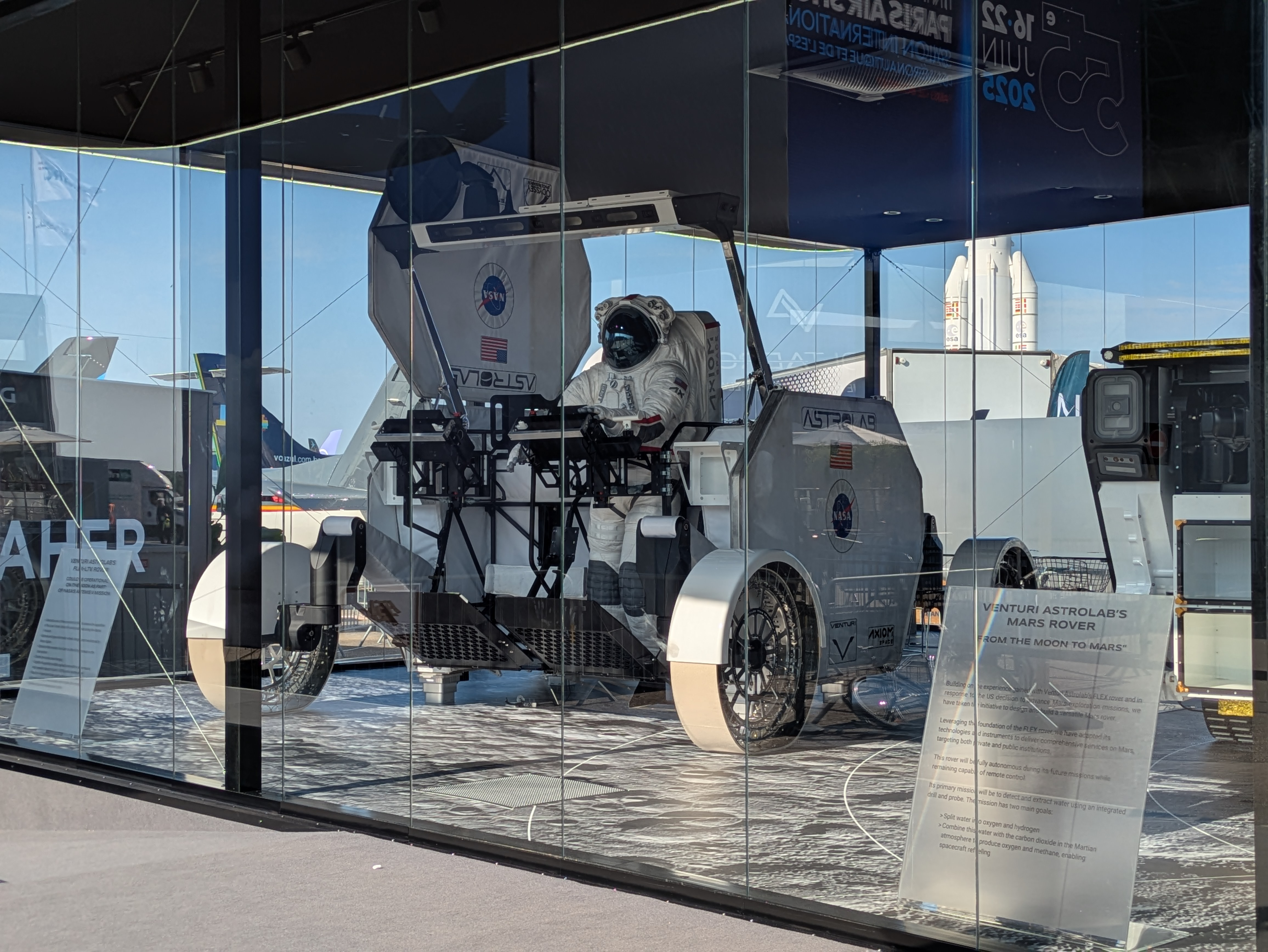
Rover FLEX-LTV at Paris Air Show 2025.

Astrolab's FLEX rover is a multi-purpose, medium-capacity surface mobility platform designed to support exploration, logistics, construction, and scientific operations. It is equipped with a modular Universal Payload Interface (UPI), allowing it to autonomously deploy, retrieve, and transport cargo of up to 1,500 kg over rugged terrain and is designed for long-term reusability, with a projected service life of up to 10 years and a range of 5,000 km. Astrolab envisions FLEX as the first in a fleet of such rovers, aiming to accelerate the establishment of a sustainable human presence on the Moon and, eventually, Mars.

=== FLIP rover ===
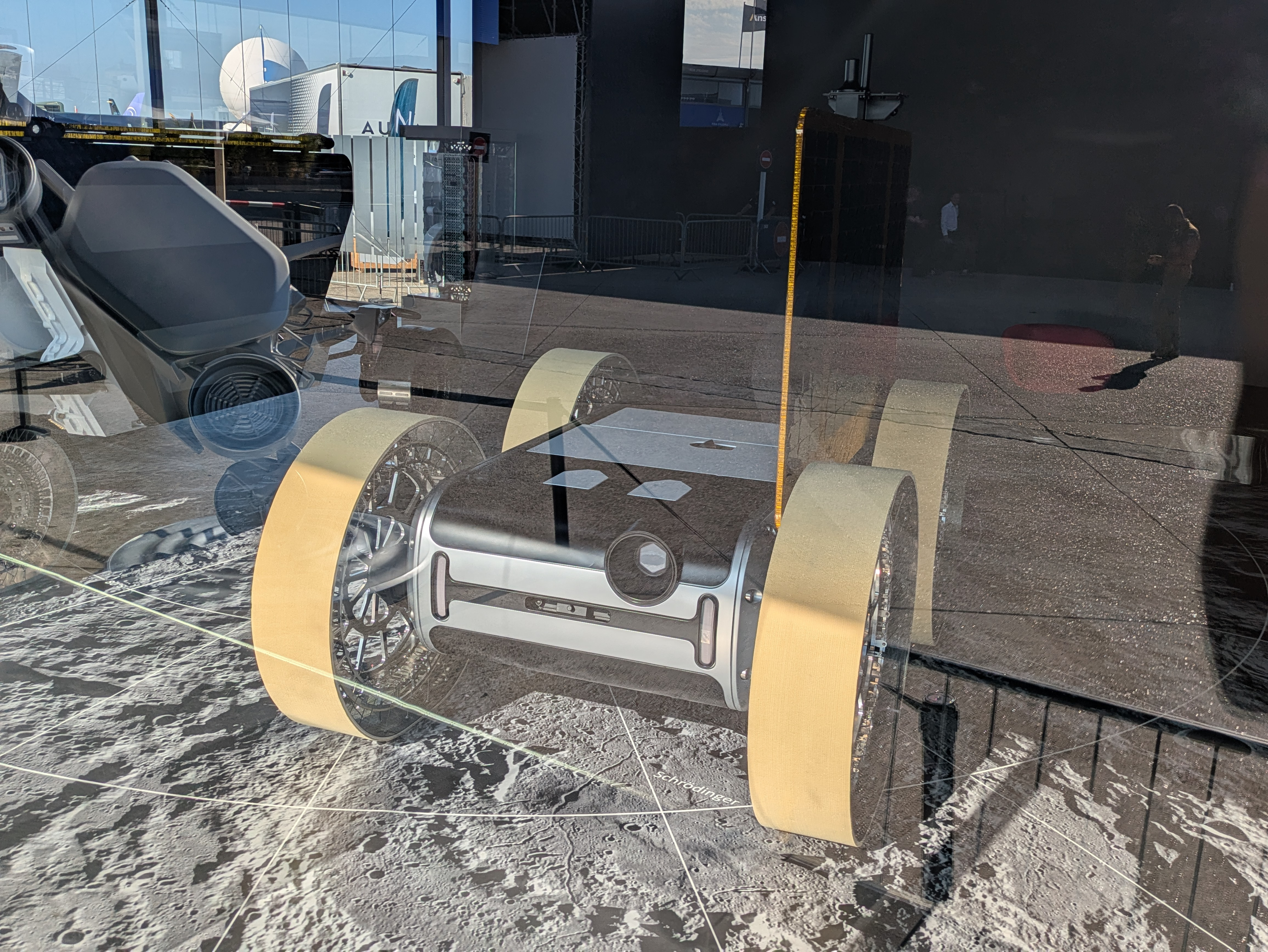
Rover FLIP at Paris Air Show 2025.

After the cancellation of NASA's VIPER mission on Astrobotic's Griffin lander, Astrolab seized the chance to reach the lunar surface by developing FLIP rover. This planned 2025 mission was intended to not only test FLIP's systems but also gather essential data on lunar dust mitigation and surface operations, informing the design and functionality of future lunar logistics platforms and prove critical FLEX subsystems such as avionics, autonomous navigation, and power systems. In August 2025 Interlune indicated the FLIP rover would carry a multispectral camera they designed to search for helium-3 on the Moon. FLIP will also carry a computer payload furnished by HPE. In December 2025 Florida Media Now announced a delay of FLIP, which was in, "thermal-vac and integrated functional tests." On October 16, 2026 Astrolab reported FLIP had completed testing.

== NASA collaboration and Artemis missions ==
In 2024, Astrolab was selected alongside Intuitive Machines and Lunar Outpost by NASA to develop lunar mobility systems for astronauts. Astrolab's rover will support Artemis astronauts on surface exploration and infrastructure-building missions, beginning as early as Artemis IV in 2028. In May 2026, NASA awarded a Lunar Terrain Vehicle contract for the CLV-1 rover, to be developed by Astrolab together with Axiom Space, Interlune and Odyssey Space Research.

== See also ==
- Lunar Terrain Vehicle
- Artemis Program
- SpaceX Starship
- Astrobotic Technology
- In situ resource utilization
