= IM-2 =

2025 lunar landing mission

IM-2 Athena
- Athena rests sideways after landing
- Mission type: Lunar landing
- Operator: Intuitive Machines
- COSPAR ID: 2025-038A
- SATCAT no.: 63099
- Mission duration: 8 days, 5 hours, 59 minutes

Spacecraft properties
- Spacecraft: Athena
- Spacecraft type: Nova-C
- Manufacturer: Intuitive Machines
- Launch mass: 2,120 kg (4,670 lb)

Start of mission
- Launch date: 27 February 2025, 00:16:30 UTC
- Rocket: Falcon 9 Block 5 B1083-9
- Launch site: Kennedy, LC-39A
- Contractor: SpaceX

End of mission
- Last contact: 7 March 2025, 06:15 UTC

Lunar lander
- Landing date: 6 March 2025, 17:28:50 UTC
- Landing site: Mons Mouton (84.7906°S 29.1957°E)
- IM-2 mission insignia Motto: INTER LUCEM ET TENEBRAS (Between Light and Darkness) Intuitive Machines Nova-C Commercial Lunar Payload Services

IM-2 was a robotic lunar landing mission operated by Intuitive Machines as part of NASA's Commercial Lunar Payload Services (CLPS) program. The Nova-C lander, named Athena, reached the surface of the Moon on 6 March 2025. Contact was temporarily lost during the landing process; when it was re-established, data indicated the spacecraft was not in the correct orientation and one of the two radio antennas was not operating. The sideways orientation prevented the spacecraft from generating sufficient power. By 7 March, Athena's power had been fully depleted and was not expected to replenish, bringing the mission to its end.

Athena was designed to investigate the presence and quantity of lunar water ice using PRIME-1, a payload of a drill and mass spectrometer. Athena also carried a drone that was equipped with a neutron spectrometer to explore the permanently shadowed region (PSR) of Marston crater near the landing site. The mission aimed to measure hydrogen in the PSR, looking for indications of solid water ice.

== Background ==
NASA uses its CLPS program to partner with commercial providers to fly experiments to the Moon. A drilling mission was originally set to launch in December 2022, for which Intuitive Machines supplied its Nova-C as the lander. This was the company's second CLPS contract.

Three CLPS launches preceded IM-2:

1. Astrobotic Technology's Peregrine in January 2024 failed shortly after launch and did not reach the Moon.
2. Intuitive Machines' IM-1 in February 2024 placed the Odysseus lander on the Moon, but the landing was rougher than expected, damaging one of the landing struts and causing the spacecraft to lean at a 30 degree angle; however, the company deemed the mission "successful" as the lander was able to generate scientific data for all payloads for an extended period of time.
3. Firefly Aerospace's Blue Ghost Mission 1 landed without problems on 2 March 2025.

This IM-2 mission on 27 February 2025 was the fourth CLPS launch and was en route to the Moon when the Blue Ghost landing occurred.

== Payloads ==
=== Nova-C lander ===
A CLPS contract was awarded to IM in October 2020 to land a second Nova-C lander near the lunar south pole. NASA designated the landing site at a ridge near the Shackleton crater, where there could be ice below the surface. After the rough landing of IM-1, several adjustments were made, including improvements to the primary laser rangefinder system, which helps determine variables such as altitude and horizontal velocity.

The MiniPIX TPX3 SPACE payload, provided by the Czech company ADVACAM, was onboard the Nova-C lunar lander. This payload is designed to monitor the radiation field on the Moon and help understand how to protect crew and equipment from the negative effects of cosmic rays. This marks the first Czech payload planned to be delivered to the Moon's surface.

Micro-Nova ("Grace")
- Mission type: Lunar hopper
- COSPAR ID: 2025-038A
- SATCAT no.: 63099

Spacecraft properties
- Manufacturer: Intuitive Machines
- Payload mass: 1 kg

Start of mission
- Rocket: Falcon 9 Block 5
- Launch site: Kennedy, LC-39A

Moon rover
- Landing site: Shackleton connecting ridge

During the mission, IM would deploy a second vehicle, its μNova (Micro-Nova) Hopper. Micro-Nova would separate from the Nova-C lander after landing and function as a standalone hopper lander, exploring multiple difficult-to-reach areas such as deep craters on the lunar surface, by firing hydrazine rockets in controlled bursts to propel itself short distances. It would hop across craters in search of lunar ice, which could contain water critical to future crewed missions to the Moon. Water ice could be processed into rocket propellant or used to support a permanent lunar habitat in the future. Micro-Nova is also planned to take the first pictures from inside craters at the lunar south pole and would be able to carry a 1-kilogram payload for more than 25 kilometers. The hopper would explore permanently shaded regions and could "fly into a lava tube and report images back", according to IM co-founder and CTO Tim Crain.

MAPP
- Mission type: Lunar rover
- COSPAR ID: 2025-038A
- SATCAT no.: 63099

Spacecraft properties
- Manufacturer: Lunar Outpost
- Landing mass: 5–10 kg
- Payload mass: 15 kg

Start of mission
- Launch date: 27 February 2025
- Rocket: Falcon 9 Block 5
- Launch site: Kennedy, LC-39A

Moon rover
- Landing site: Mons Mouton

Instruments
- RESOURCE

AstroAnt
- Mission type: Lunar rover
- COSPAR ID: 2025-038A
- SATCAT no.: 63099

Spacecraft properties
- Manufacturer: MIT
- Dimensions: The size of a matchbox

Start of mission
- Launch date: 27 February 2025
- Launch site: Kennedy, LC-39A

Moon rover
- Landing site: Mons Mouton

Space technology company Lunar Outpost would send their first lunar rover, the Mobile Autonomous Prospecting Platform (MAPP), on this mission in partnership with Nokia Bell Labs and IM. MAPP would collect lunar samples for NASA under a contract worth just $1, which is symbolic of a new incentive for the emerging commercial space industry to access resources in space. MAPP would have a mass of 5–10 kilograms, a payload mass of up to 15 kilograms, and a top speed of 10 cm/s. On its multi-day journey, the rover would autonomously map the lunar surface, capture stereo images and thermal data, and inspect samples of lunar regolith in a special bin mounted on its wheels. Photos of the samples and other data would be transmitted through radio equipment and antennas to communicate with the Nova-C lander. MAPP would snap 3D images and record videos using the RESOURCE camera, developed by MIT. It would also deploy MIT's AstroAnt, a miniature rover the size of a matchbox, to conduct contactless temperature measurements as it drives around on MAPP's roof.

A collaboration in order to demonstrate 4G cellular connectivity, in partnership with Nokia Bell Labs and NASA was aboard the lander. Nokia's equipment was a Network-In-a-Box and would connect the Nova-C lander with Lunar Outpost's MAPP rover and IM's Micro-Nova Hopper. This 4G/LTE network would provide more bandwidth than the more conventional ultra-high frequency (UHF) systems used for space communication. Nokia says they hope that future missions would use shared infrastructure to interlink bases on the lunar surface.

=== Yaoki rover ===
IM-2 carried the Moon rover Yaoki. It was made by Japanese company Dymon and weighed 498 grams.

=== MAPP rover ===
Athena also carried a Lunar Outpost Mobile Autonomous Prospecting Platform (MAPP) rover.

=== PRIME-1 ===
The primary payload, Polar Resources Ice Mining Experiment-1 (PRIME-1) was designed to search for water ice on the Moon at a permanently shadowed location near Shackleton Crater. It included the TRIDENT ice drill to sample ice from below the lunar surface and the MSolo mass spectrometer to measure the amount of ice in the samples. ILO-1 prime contractor Canadensys was working to deliver "a flight-ready low-cost optical payload for the ILO-1 mission, ruggedized for the Moon South Pole environment". On February 27, IM-2 released photography taken with the help of Canadensys technology. In November 2023, a mission simulation was undertaken by engineers at the Kennedy Space Center.

==== Instruments ====
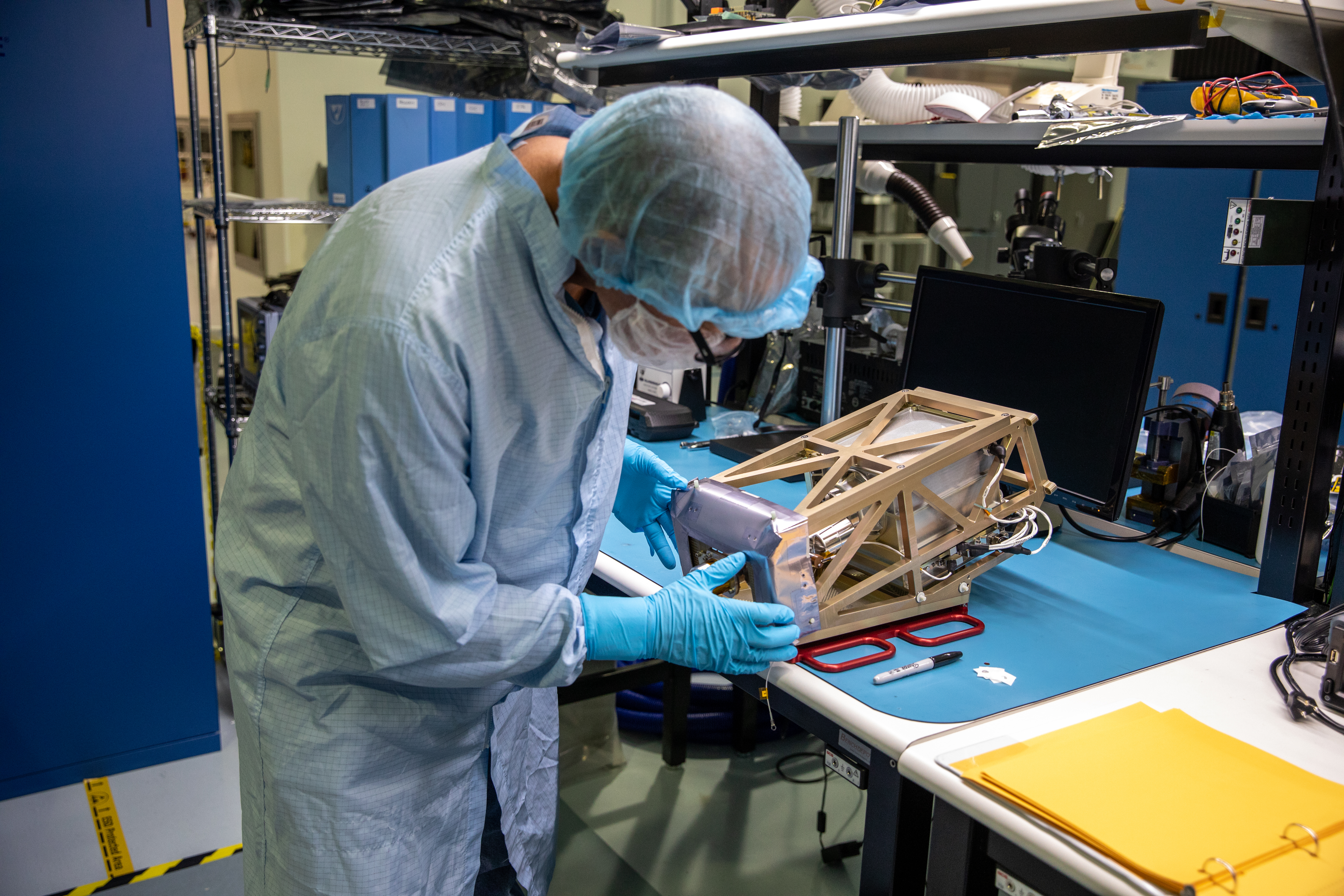
Engineers prepare the Mass Spectrometer Observing Lunar Operations (MSolo) instrument

The mission was to measure the volatile content of subsurface samples on the Moon. The scientific equipment consisted primarily of two components mounted to the lander:

- The Regolith and Ice Drill for Exploring New Terrain (TRIDENT): Would have drilled up to three feet deep, extracting lunar regolith, or soil, up to the surface. The instrument could drill in multiple segments, pausing and retracting to deposit cuttings on the surface after each depth increment.
- Mass Spectrometer observing lunar operations (MSolo): This modified-for-spaceflight, commercial-off-the-shelf mass spectrometer would have evaluated the drill cuttings for water and other chemical compounds. Soil samples from multiple depths would have been analyzed.

A version of TRIDENT and MSolo may also be used on NASA's VIPER rover to search for water ice.

PRIME-1 weighed 40 kg (88 lb). It was to investigate in situ resource utilization (ISRU).

== Mission events ==
=== Prior to launch ===
In May 2024, the company announced that IM-2 was entering the final assembly stage. It was also reported that the company was upgrading both software and hardware, including the landing legs in order for better precision and control during descent and landing on the IM-2 mission. In September 2024, the company said it was on track for launch in January 2025. The Lunar Trailblazer orbiter was a secondary payload on the same Falcon 9 launch. In November 2024, during an earnings call, Intuitive Machines said the launch of IM-2 was targeting February 2025.

During mission planning, IM-2 intended to land at Shackleton connecting ridge. Nevertheless, prior to launch, the targeted landing site was changed to Mons Mouton, a high plateau near the Lunar south pole which was planned to be the landing site of the canceled VIPER rover.

=== Launch ===
IM-2 launched on 27 February 2025, at 00:16 UTC, aboard a SpaceX Falcon 9 with a number of other payloads. Following an on-target orbital insertion, Athena deployed 45 minutes after launch and established contact with ground controllers at 01:17 UTC. It was confirmed the next morning that the IM-2 mission was on track for a lunar orbital insertion on March 3, with a landing attempt scheduled for March 6 at 17:31 UTC.

=== Landing ===
Three minutes before touchdown at 17:27 UTC on 6 March, Athena entered terminal descent. A plume of lunar dust interfered with its navigation systems, obscuring laser and rangefinder readings while also disrupting radio signals. After a brief period of no communication, mission controllers confirmed that Athena had landed, detected lunar gravity, and was generating power. However, one of its two radio antennas had lost signal, and power generation was lower than expected. The Intuitive Machines team placed Athena in a power-saving "safe mode," but after 38 minutes of troubleshooting, they determined the lander was not receiving sufficient energy.

At a 21:00 UTC press conference, Intuitive Machines CEO Steve Altemus said that Athena was not in the correct attitude, meaning its solar panels were not facing the Sun. Despite this, the lander had begun performing scientific experiments, though at limited capacity due to the power constraints. On 7 March, downlinked images confirmed that Athena had come to rest sideways in a shadowed crater where the temperature was −173 °C (−280 °F). With the solar arrays producing only about 100 watts of power – insufficient to operate both the spacecraft’s heaters and its high-gain antenna – mission operators opted to maximize data collection over a 13-hour period rather than run the heaters to extend operations, but with minimal ability to conduct scientific experiments. During this time, Athena transmitted imagery and data from the Moon’s south pole. The TRIDENT drill was extended but not operated, and private customers, including Nokia, retrieved useful data from their payloads. However the rovers and Micro-Nova were not able to be deployed.

On 13 March, Intuitive Machines shared that, like on the IM-1 mission, the Athena's altimeter had failed during landing, leaving its onboard computer without an accurate altitude reading. As a result, the spacecraft struck a plateau, tipped over, and skidded across the lunar surface, rolling once or twice before settling inside a crater. The company's CEO compared it to a baseball player sliding into a base. The impact also kicked up regolith that coated the solar panels in dust, further degrading their performance.

Map of all moon landings made by crewed and uncrewed craft. IM-2 is the lime green dot, marked "28".

=== Post-mission ===
On 7 March 2025, at 16:54:21 UTC, the Lunar Reconnaissance Orbiter (LRO) imaged the Athena spacecraft landed within the center of a 20 m (66 ft) wide crater, about 23.5 hours after it touched down the lunar surface. The orbiter subsequently imaged the lander again at a much more oblique angle on 10 March.

On 7 March 2025, Intuitive Machines announced that the mission was over after Athena landed on its side in the Mons Mouton region near the south pole of the Moon. The same day, NASA confirmed that lander operations ended at 1:15 a.m., less than 13 hours after landing.

== See also ==
- List of missions to the Moon
- Chandrayaan-3 – Indian lunar mission (2023–present)
- Luna 25 – Failed Russian lunar lander
- SLIM – Japanese lunar lander (2023–2024)
