= CubeRover =

Class of planetary rover

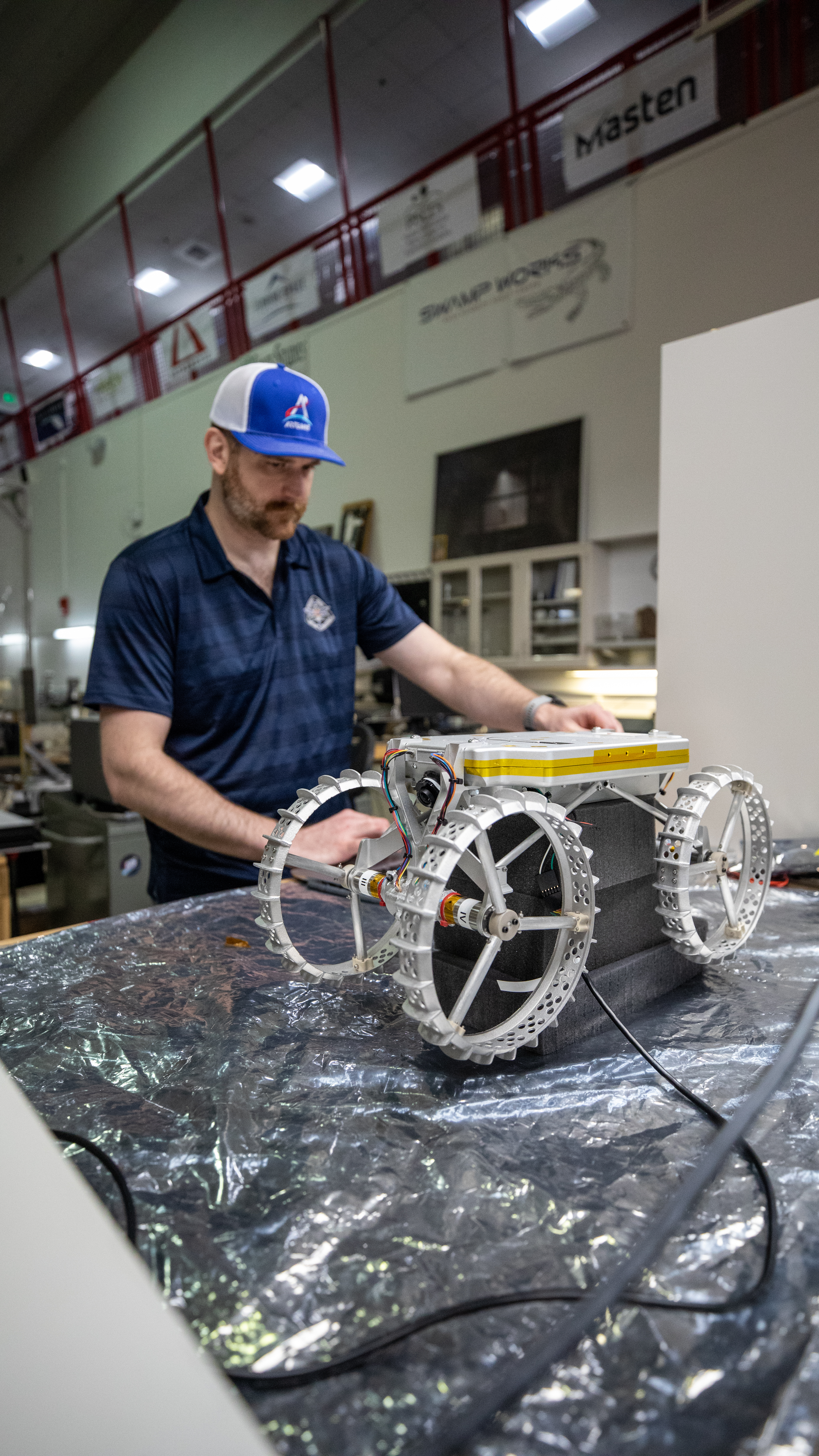
- Astrobotic's CubeRover
- Mission type: Technology demonstrator
- Operator: Astrobotic Lab and Carnegie Mellon University
- Website: www.astrobotic.com

Spacecraft properties
- Spacecraft: Iris
- Spacecraft type: Robotic lunar rover
- Bus: CubeRover

Start of mission
- Launch date: 8 January 2024 07:18:36 UTC
- Rocket: Vulcan Centaur VC2S
- Launch site: Cape Canaveral SLC-41
- Contractor: United Launch Alliance

Moon rover
- Landing date: 23 February 2024 (originally planned)
- Landing site: Planned: Mons Gruithuisen Gamma

Transponders
- Band: Wi-Fi

Instruments
- Two cameras with 1936 × 1456 resolution

CubeRover is a class of planetary rover with a standardized modular format meant to accelerate the pace of space exploration. The idea is equivalent to that of the successful CubeSat format, with standardized off-the-shelf components and architecture to assemble small units that will be all compatible, modular, and inexpensive.

The rover class concept is being developed by Astrobotic Technology in partnership with Carnegie Mellon University, and it is partly funded by NASA awards. A Carnegie Mellon University initiative - completely independent of NASA awards - developed Iris, the first flightworthy CubeRover. It was launched on 8 January 2024 along with Peregrine Mission One. Student engineers and researchers monitored and communicated with Iris rover in space via Carnegie Mellon Mission Control. Surface operations phased out along with landing of Peregrine lander due to excessive propellant leak.

== Overview ==
=== Concept ===
The idea is to create a practical modular concept similar that used for CubeSats and apply it to rovers, effectively creating a new standardized architecture of small modular planetary rovers with compatible parts, systems, and even instruments so that each mission can be easily tailored to its objectives. The rovers are expendable and do not use solar arrays for electrical power, depending solely on non-rechargeable batteries. This allows it to be lighter, have a larger cooling radiator panel for electronics, and have a simpler avionics design.

The CubeRover program intends that standardizing small rover design with a common architecture will open access to planetary bodies for companies, governments, and universities around the world at a low cost, while increasing functionality, just as the CubeSat has in Earth orbit. This would motivate other members of the space exploration community to develop new systems and instruments that are all compatible with the CubeRover's architecture.

=== Development ===
In May 2017 Astrobotic Technology, in partnership with Carnegie Mellon University, were selected by NASA's Small Business Innovation Research (SBIR) to receive a $125,000 award to develop a small lunar rover architecture capable of performing small-scale science and exploration on the Moon and other planetary surfaces. During Phase I, the team built a 2-kg rover and performed engineering studies to determine the architecture of a novel chassis, power, computing systems, software and navigation techniques.

In March 2018, the team was awarded funds to move on to Phase II, and under this agreement, Astrobotic and CMU were to produce a flight-ready rover with a mass of approximately 2 kg (4.4 lb).

In future missions, CubeRovers may be designed to take advantage of lander-based systems to shelter for the cold lunar night, that lasts for 14 Earth days. Similarly, future larger CubeRovers may be able to incorporate thermal insulation and systems qualified for ultra-low temperatures.

== Missions ==
On August 20, 2025 Astrobotic indicated LunaGrid-Lite, a planned lunar power demonstration mission, would be conducted using a CubeRover. They intend to be ready for flight in 2026.

On June 11, 2025 YouTube creator and Author Matt Parker announced a kickstarter to Calculate PI on the Moon utilizing the extra computing space available on the CubeRover. The mission was fully funded within 2 hours of going live, with over 200% raised within the first 24 hours of going live. Final amount raised was 5.12X the initial goal, by over 4,800 individual backers.
