= VIPER (rover) =

Planned NASA lunar rover

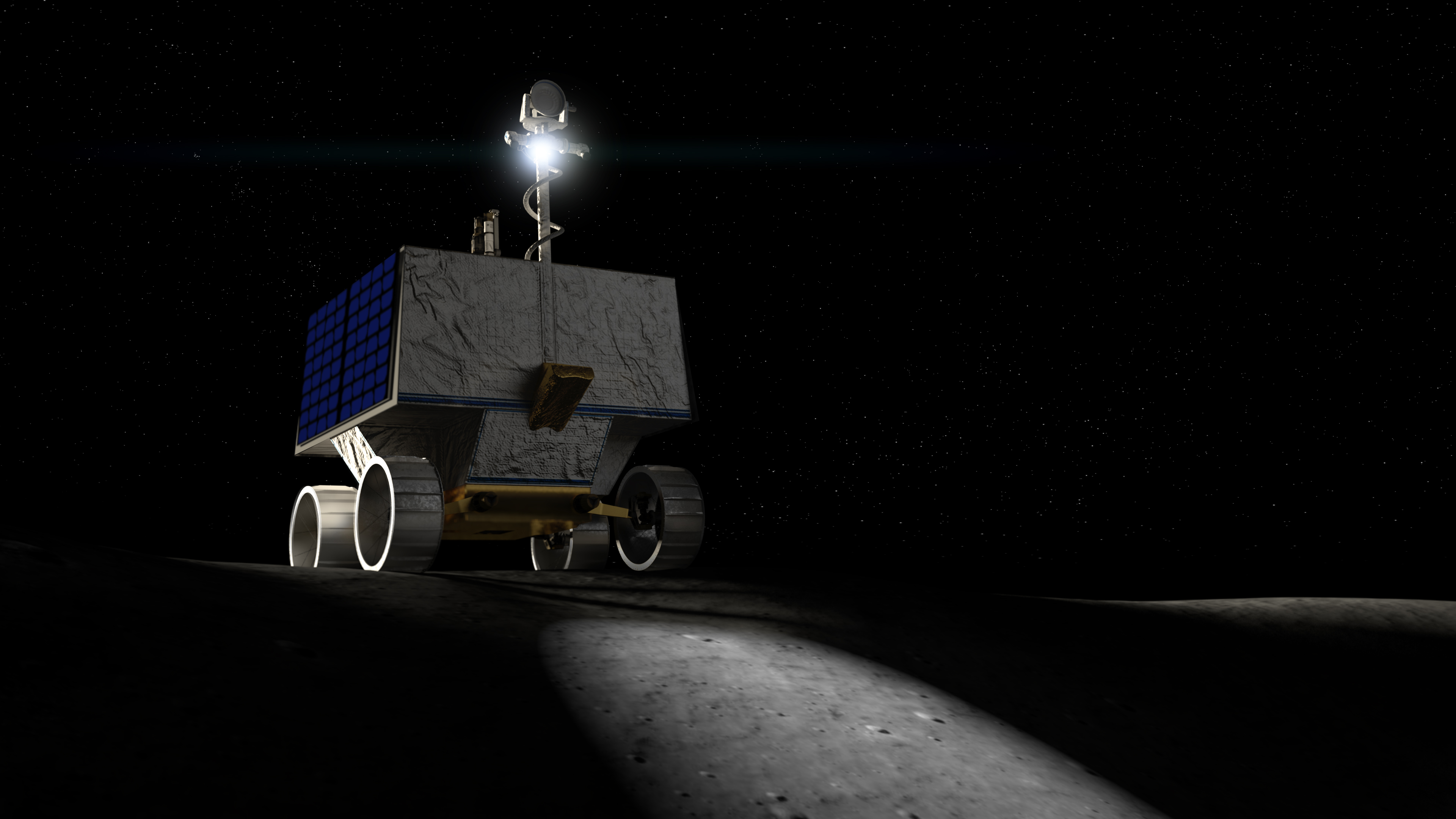
- Artist's impression of VIPER operating in darkness.
- Names: Volatiles Investigating Polar Exploration Rover
- Mission type: Exploration, resource prospecting
- Operator: NASA
- Website: https://www.nasa.gov/viper
- Mission duration: 100 days (planned)

Spacecraft properties
- Spacecraft type: Robotic lunar rover
- Manufacturer: NASA Lyndon B. Johnson Space Center
- Dry mass: 430 kg (950 lb)
- Dimensions: 2.45 m (8 ft 0 in) in height, 1.53 m (5 ft 0 in) in length and width

Start of mission
- Launch date: 2027 (Planned)
- Rocket: New Glenn
- Launch site: Cape Canaveral Space Force Station, LC-36
- Contractor: Blue Origin

Moon rover
- Landing date: 2027
- Landing site: Mons Mouton, South pole region

Instruments
- Neutron Spectrometer System (NSS); Near InfraRed Volatiles Spectrometer System (NIRVSS); The Regolith and Ice Drill for Exploring New Terrain (TRIDENT); Mass Spectrometer Observing Lunar Operations (MSolo)

VIPER (Volatiles Investigating Polar Exploration Rover) is a lunar rover being developed at the NASA Ames Research Center. The rover's main mission is to prospect for lunar resources in permanently shadowed areas of the lunar south pole region, especially by mapping the distribution and concentration of water ice. The mission is built on a previous NASA rover concept, the Resource Prospector, which had been cancelled in 2018. VIPER was to be carried aboard Astrobotic's Griffin lander as part of NASA's Commercial Lunar Payload Services (CLPS) initiative. However, NASA terminated the VIPER project in July 2024 due to cost increases and launch delays. NASA subsequently revived the project in September 2025, releasing an Announcement for Partnership Proposal seeking U.S. companies to deliver and operate the completed VIPER rover on the Moon. In September 2025, NASA selected Blue Origin to carry VIPER to the Moon. Under this partnership, Blue Origin will design, test, and operate a lander to carry the rover to the Moon.

== Objectives ==
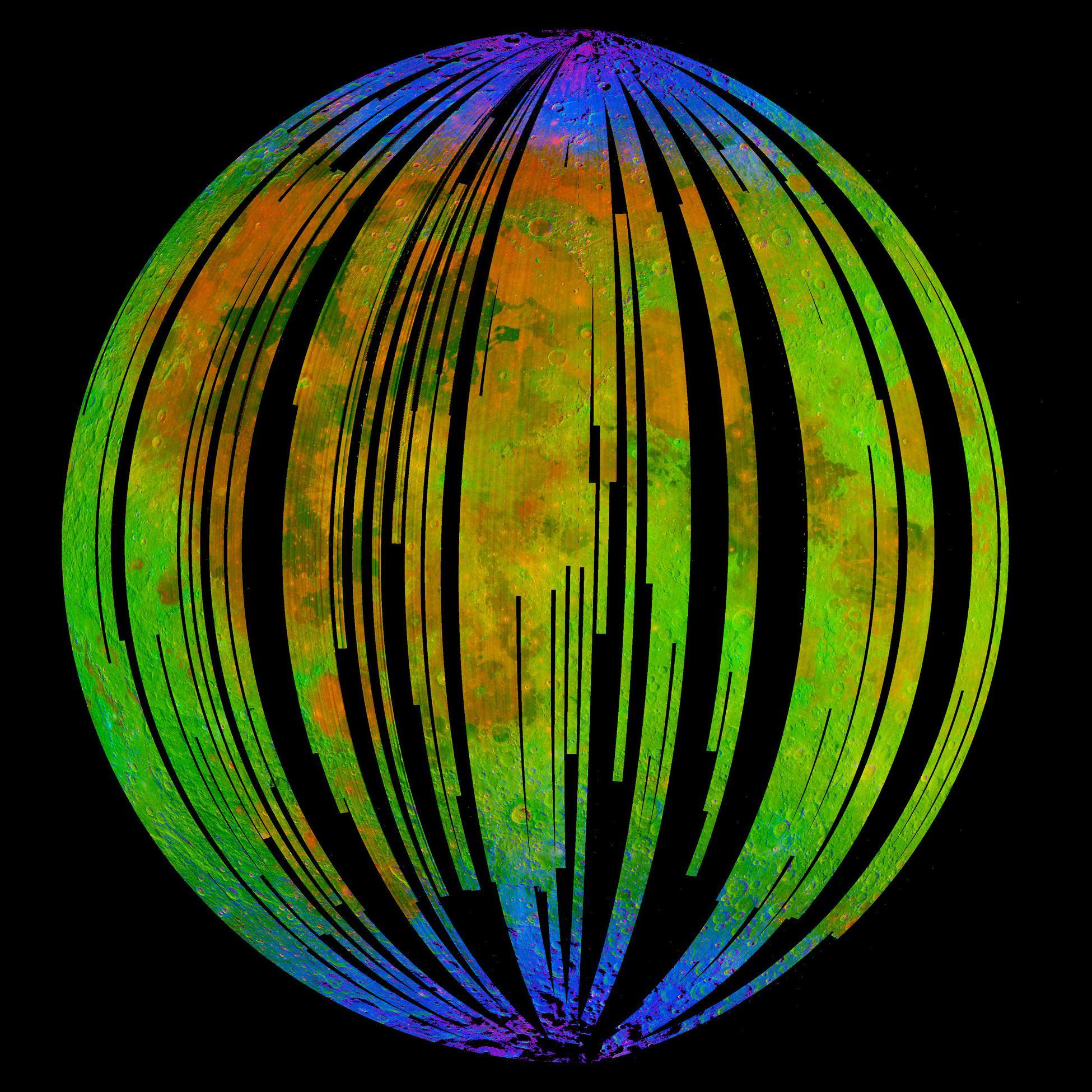
Orbital survey of the Moon taken by the Moon Mineralogy Mapper instrument on India's Chandrayaan-1 orbiter. Blue shows the spectral signature of hydroxide, green shows the brightness of the surface as measured by reflected infrared radiation from the Sun and red shows a mineral called pyroxene.

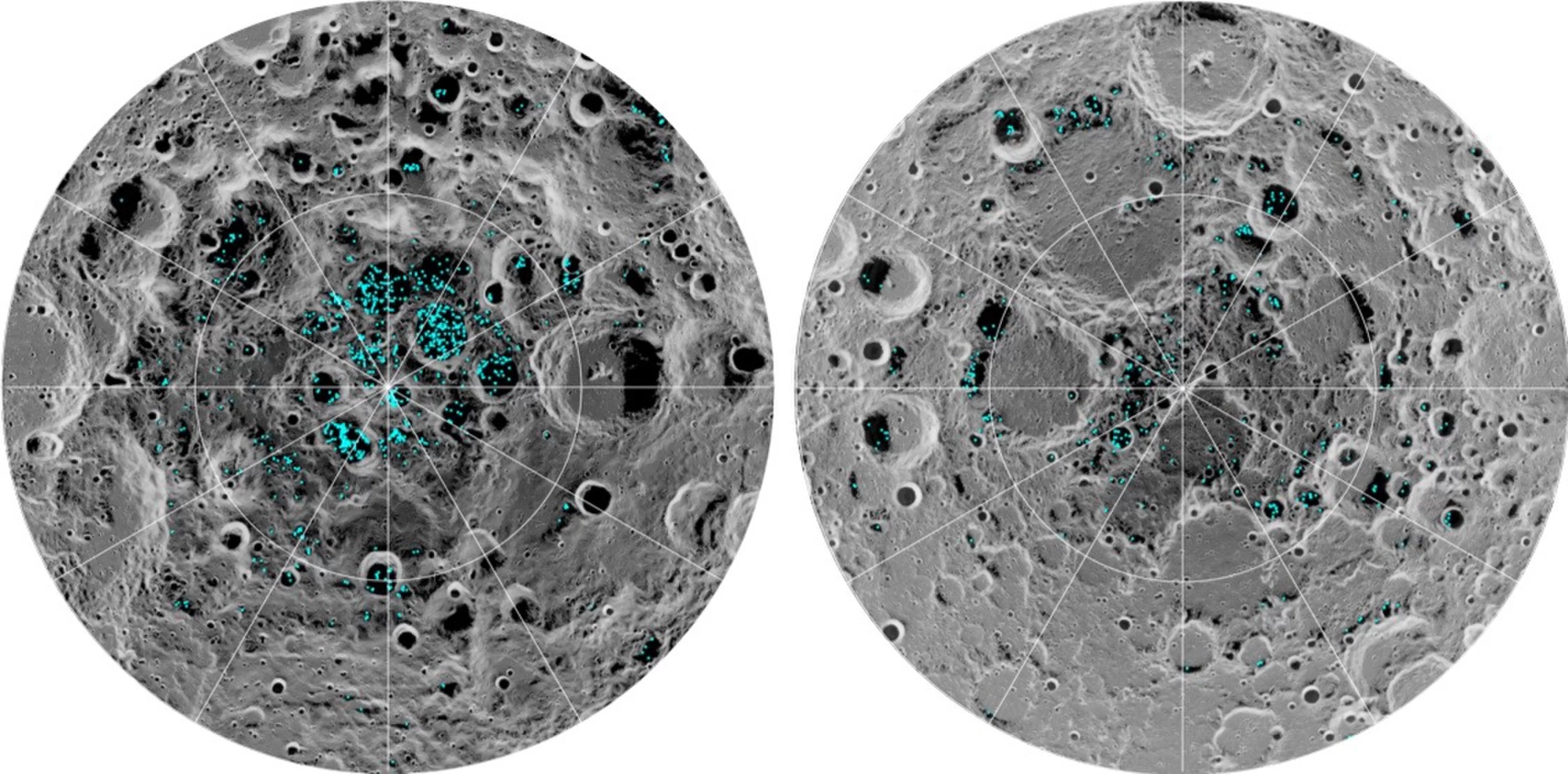
The image shows the distribution of surface ice at the Moon's south pole (left) and north pole (right) as viewed by NASA's Moon Mineralogy Mapper (M^{3}) spectrometer onboard India's Chandrayaan-1 orbiter.

The VIPER rover has a size similar to a golf cart (around 1.4 × 1.4 × 2 m), and is tasked with prospecting for lunar resources, especially for water ice, mapping its distribution, and measuring its depth and purity. The water distribution and form must be better understood before it can be evaluated as a potential resource within any evolvable lunar or Mars campaign.

Proposed landing site of the Volatiles Investigating Polar Exploration Rover (VIPER)

The VIPER rover is planned to operate on the western edge of Nobile crater on Mons Mouton in the Moon's south pole region. The first rover with its own lighting source, it was planned to rove several kilometers, collecting data on different kinds of soil environments affected by light and temperature—those in complete darkness, occasional light and in constant sunlight. In permanently shadowed locations, it would operate on battery power alone and would not be able to recharge them until it drives to a sunlit area. Its total operation time was planned to be 100 Earth days.

== History ==
In February 2024 the final instrument, the TRIDENT drill, was installed into the rover. Later on 28 February 2024, VIPER Project Manager Dan Andrews announced that all the rover's scientific instruments were installed, and that it was more than 80% built. Further progress was reported in April 2024, remaining on track for launch later in the year. The rover moved to the environmental testing phase in May.

=== Cancellation in 2024 ===
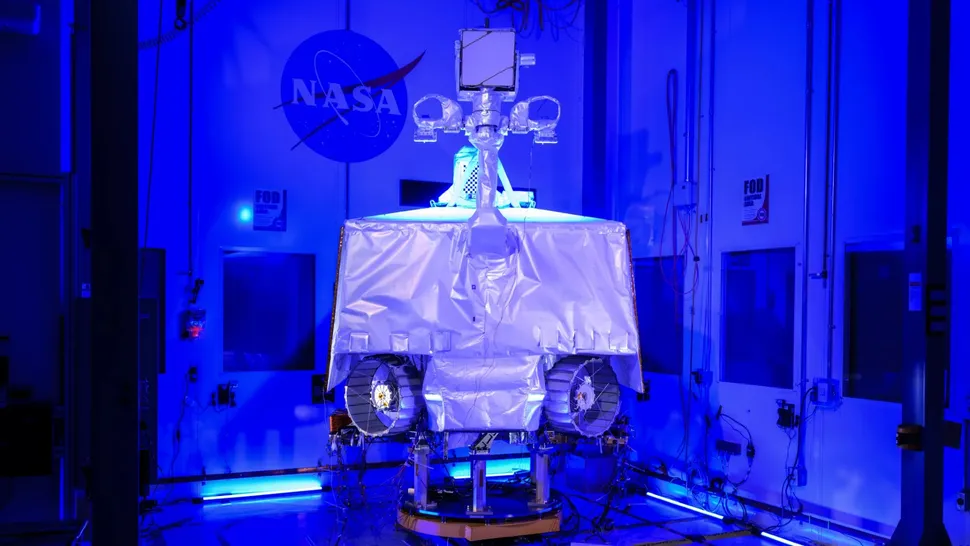
NASA's VIPER assembled at Johnson Space Center, when it was canceled

Amidst cost growth and delays to readiness of the rover and the Griffin lander, the VIPER program was ended in July 2024, with the then-completed but yet to be tested rover planned to be disassembled and its instruments and components reused for other lunar missions. Before commencing disassembly, NASA announced they would consider "expressions of interest" from industry to use the "VIPER rover system at no cost to the government." At the time of the announcement NASA expected to save $84 million by canceling the mission, which has cost $450 million so far. The budgeted cost to build VIPER was $433.5 million, with $235.6 million budgeted to launch the lander. The agency still plans to support the Griffin lander to arrive on the Moon in fall of 2025, though with Astrolab' FLIP rover in place of the VIPER rover. NASA expects the primary objectives of VIPER to be fulfilled by an array of other missions planned for the next several years, but these may eventually become overshadowed and forgotten over time.

=== Response to cancellation ===
VIPER's abrupt cancellation was received poorly by the scientific community. At the time of its cancellation, VIPER had been fully assembled and completed vibration testing. In response, a letter opposing the cancellation was circulated and garnered over 2500 signatures by the end of July 2024. In August 2024, The Planetary Society published a statement calling for the program to be reconsidered. On 6 September 2024, the House Committee on Science, Space, and Technology published a letter requesting additional information as to why NASA cancelled the mission.

=== Post-cancellation developments ===
In February 2025, NASA announced a new approach to potentially revive the VIPER mission through an industry partnership. The agency released an Announcement for Partnership Proposal seeking U.S. companies to deliver and operate the completed VIPER rover on the Moon. Under the proposed partnership, NASA would provide the already-built VIPER rover while the selected company would be responsible for the launch, landing, and surface operations, including data collection and dissemination, as well as all mission costs.

=== Revival ===
On 19 September 2025, NASA announced the awarding of a Commercial Lunar Payload Services (CLPS) task order to Blue Origin, a commercial NASA partner that is a part of the Artemis Program using their Blue Moon MK1 Lander to land at the south pole of the Moon. As a part of this task order, Blue Origin will deliver the rover to the lunar surface. Both NASA and Blue Origin have expressed eagerness in including VIPER as a part of the mission, but it is likely that the ultimate decision to include VIPER relies on the success of the first mission of the Blue Moon MK1 Lander, another CLPS mission.

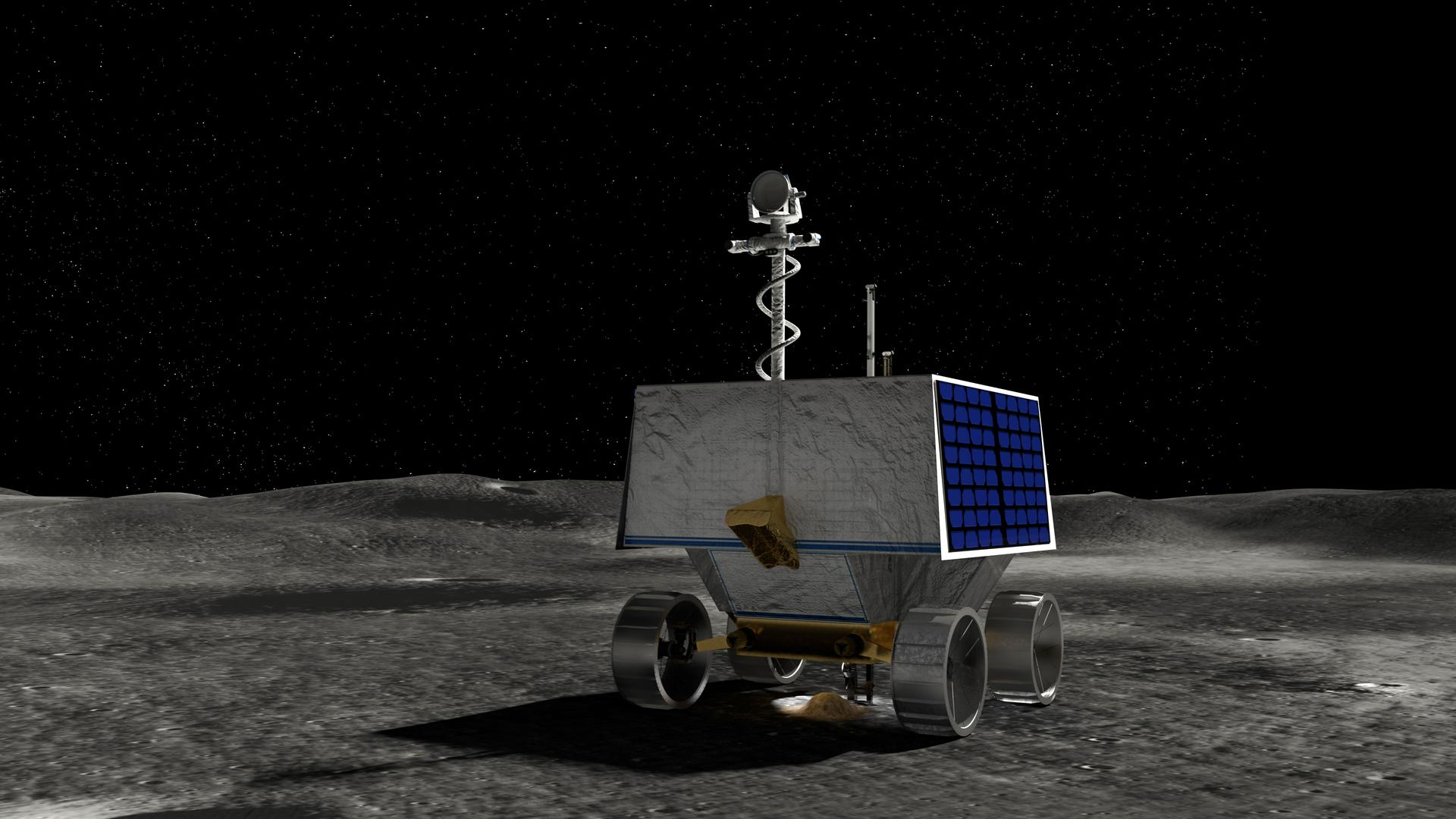
Artist's conception of the VIPER rover on the Moon (Image courtesy of NASA Ames Research Center)

== Project management ==
The VIPER rover is part of the Lunar Discovery and Exploration Program managed by the Science Mission Directorate at NASA Headquarters, and was meant to support the crewed Artemis program. NASA's Ames Research Center was managing the rover project. The hardware for the rover was designed by the Johnson Space Center, while the instruments were provided by Ames, Kennedy, and Honeybee Robotics. The project manager was Daniel Andrews, and the project scientist was Anthony Colaprete, who was implementing the technology developed for the now cancelled Resource Prospector rover. The estimated cost of the mission was US$250 million in October 2019. NASA said on 3 March 2021 that the new lifecycle cost for the mission was US$433.5 million.

Both the launcher and the lander were competitively provided through Commercial Lunar Payload Services (CLPS) contractors, with Astrobotic providing the Griffin lander to deliver the rover, and SpaceX providing the Falcon Heavy launch vehicle. NASA was aiming to land the rover in September 2025 until the mission was canceled on 17 July 2024.

== Capabilities ==
At the lunar south pole VIPER will collect images and make neutron measurements while traveling between locations of interest. At those locations the rover will shift to "Prospecting” mode, allowing higher fidelity measurements. The rover will be capable of:

- operating for 5-6 lunar days
- drilling 50 samples
- traversing 20 km (12 mi)
- driving at 20 cm/s (2,400 ft/h) (max)
- moving between destinations at 0.8 cm/s (94 ft/h)
- exploring temperature regimes from 40 to 300 K (−387.7 to 80.3 °F)
- driving 1.7 km (1.1 mi) in PSRs
- drilling 5 samples in PSRs

== Science background ==
Data obtained by Lunar Prospector, Lunar Reconnaissance Orbiter, Chandrayaan-1, and the Lunar Crater Observation and Sensing Satellite, revealed that lunar water is present in the form of ice near the lunar poles, especially within permanently shadowed craters in the south pole region, and present in the form of hydrated minerals in other high-latitude locations.

Water may have been delivered to the Moon over geological timescales by the regular bombardment of water-bearing comets, asteroids and meteoroids, or continuously produced in situ by the hydrogen ions (protons) of the solar wind impacting oxygen-bearing minerals. The physical form of the water ice is unknown, but some studies suggest that it is unlikely to be present in the form of thick, pure ice deposits, and may be a thin coating on soil grains.

If it is possible to mine and extract the water molecules (H_{2}O) in large amounts, it can be broken down to its elements, namely hydrogen and oxygen, and form molecular hydrogen (H_{2}) and molecular oxygen (O_{2}) to be used as rocket bi-propellant or produce compounds for metallurgic and chemical production processes. Just the production of propellant, was estimated by a joint panel of industry, government and academic experts, identified a near-term annual demand of 450 metric tons of lunar-derived propellant equating to 2450 metric tons of processed lunar water, generating US$2.4 billion of revenue annually.

== Science payload ==
The VIPER rover will be equipped with a drill and three analyzers. The Neutron Spectrometer System (NSS), will detect sub-surface water from a distance, then, VIPER will stop at that location and deploy a 1 m (3 ft 3 in) drill called TRIDENT to obtain samples to be analyzed by its two onboard spectrometers, MSolo and NIRVSS. Previously a TRIDENT drill and MSolo mass spectrometer were incorporated into the PRIME-1 payload of the unsuccessful IM-2 lunar landing mission.

Instrument name	Abbr.	Provider	Function
Neutron Spectrometer System	NSS	Ames Research Center (NASA)	Detect sub-surface hydrogen (potentially water) from a distance, suggesting prime sites for drilling
The Regolith and Ice Drill for Exploring New Terrain	TRIDENT	Honeybee Robotics	1-m drill to obtain subsurface samples
Near InfraRed Volatiles Spectrometer System	NIRVSS	Ames Research Center (NASA)	Analyze mineral and volatile composition
Mass Spectrometer Observing Lunar Operations	MSolo	Kennedy Space Center (NASA)	Analyze mineral and volatile composition

=== NSS ===
NSS measures the energy released by hydrogen atoms when struck by neutrons. It was developed for the cancelled Resource Prospector rover.

=== TRIDENT ===
The TRIDENT drill contains two temperature sensors, one at the tip and one about 20 cm (7.9 in) up. In addition to drilling and bringing up samples for NIRVSS and MSolo, its temperature sensors can measure the subsurface temperature. Combined with its heater element, TRIDENT can measure the thermal conductivity of the regolith. In addition, measuring the force necessary to drill reveals geotechnical properties of the regolith.

=== NIRVSS ===
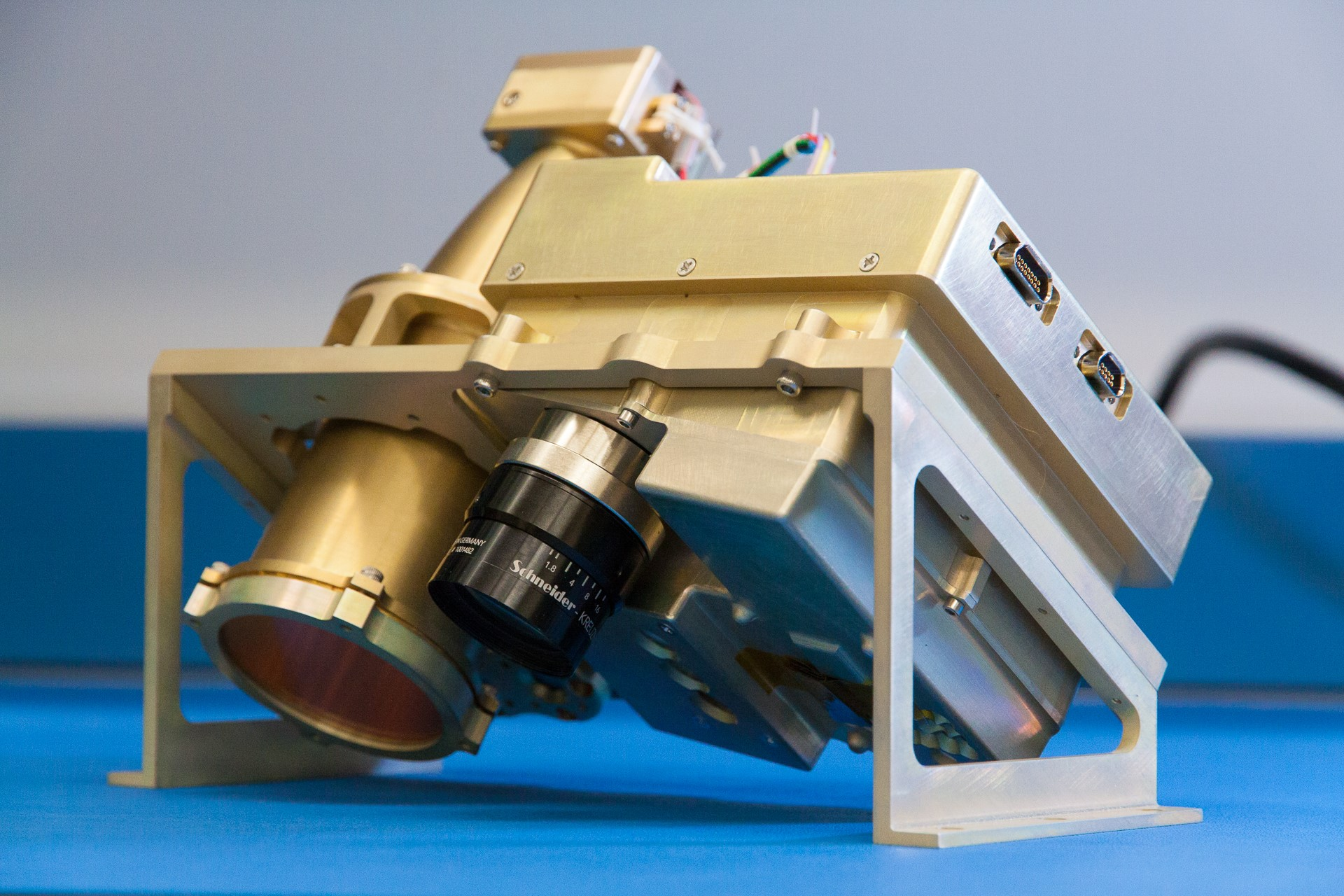
The NIRVSS instrument

NIRVSS will determine if the hydrogen it encounters belong to water molecules (H_{2}O) or to hydroxyl (OH^{−}). Originally developed for the Resource Prospector rover.
Sub-systems: Spectrometer Context Imager (a broad-spectrum camera); Longwave Calibration Sensor (measures surface temperature at very small scales).

=== MSolo ===
MSolo will measure the mass-to-charge ratio of ions to elucidate the chemical elements contained in the sample. The instrument was created through a collaboration with INFICON, in which one of their mass commercial spectrometers was modified to make it suitable for spaceflight.

== See also ==
- Lunar water
- Lunar resources – In situ resources on the Moon
- FLIP (rover)
