= Terrae Novae =

European programme for human spaceflight and robotic space exploration

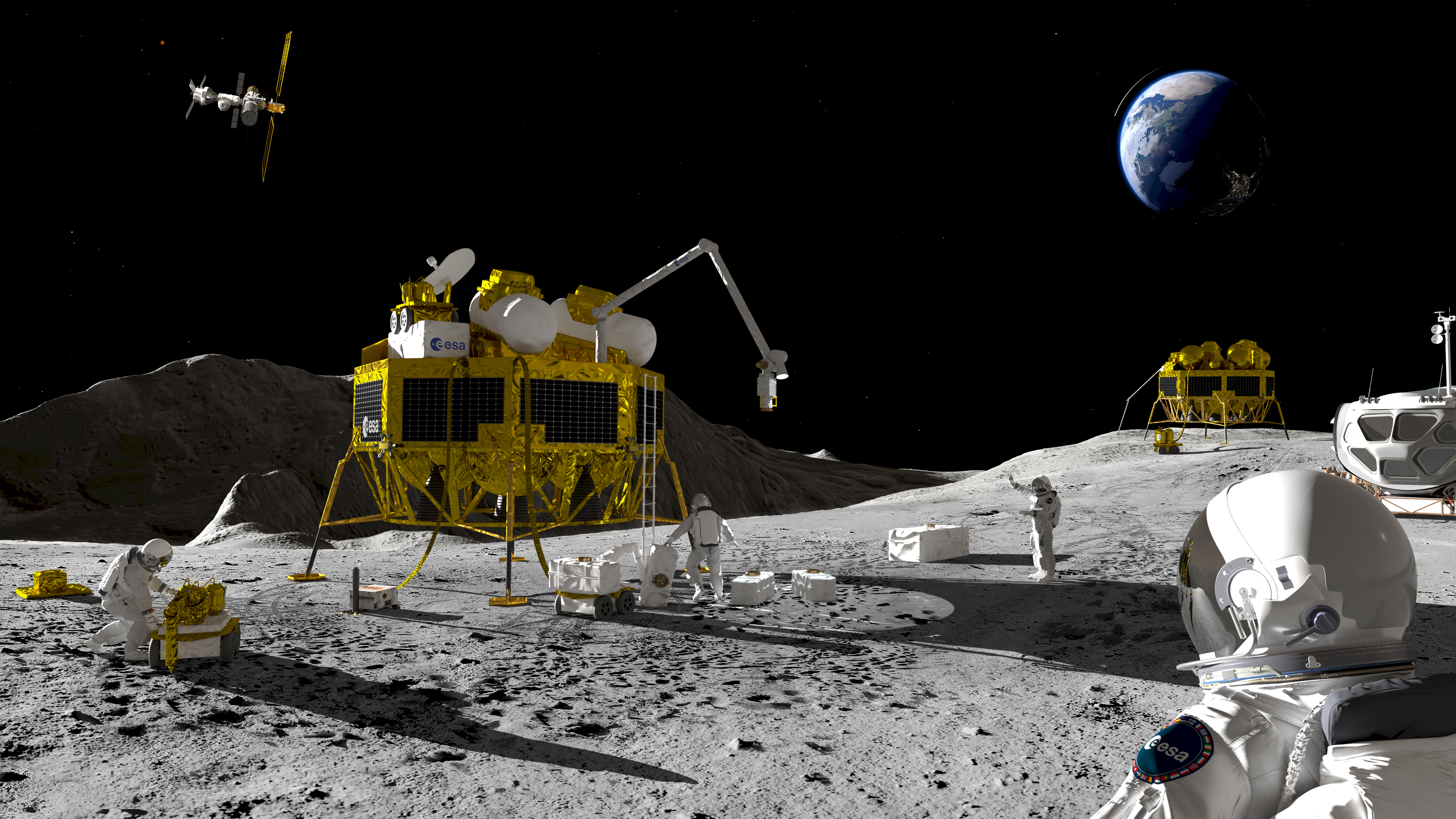
- Type of project: Spaceflight
- Owner: European Space Agency
- Established: 2016

Terrae Novae (Latin for 'New Worlds'), also known as the European Exploration Envelope Programme (E3P) and Human and Robotic Exploration programme, is an optional programme of the European Space Agency (ESA) responsible for developing and operating human spaceflight and related robotic space exploration missions to three space destinations: Low Earth orbit (LEO), the Moon, and Mars.

== Programmes and missions ==
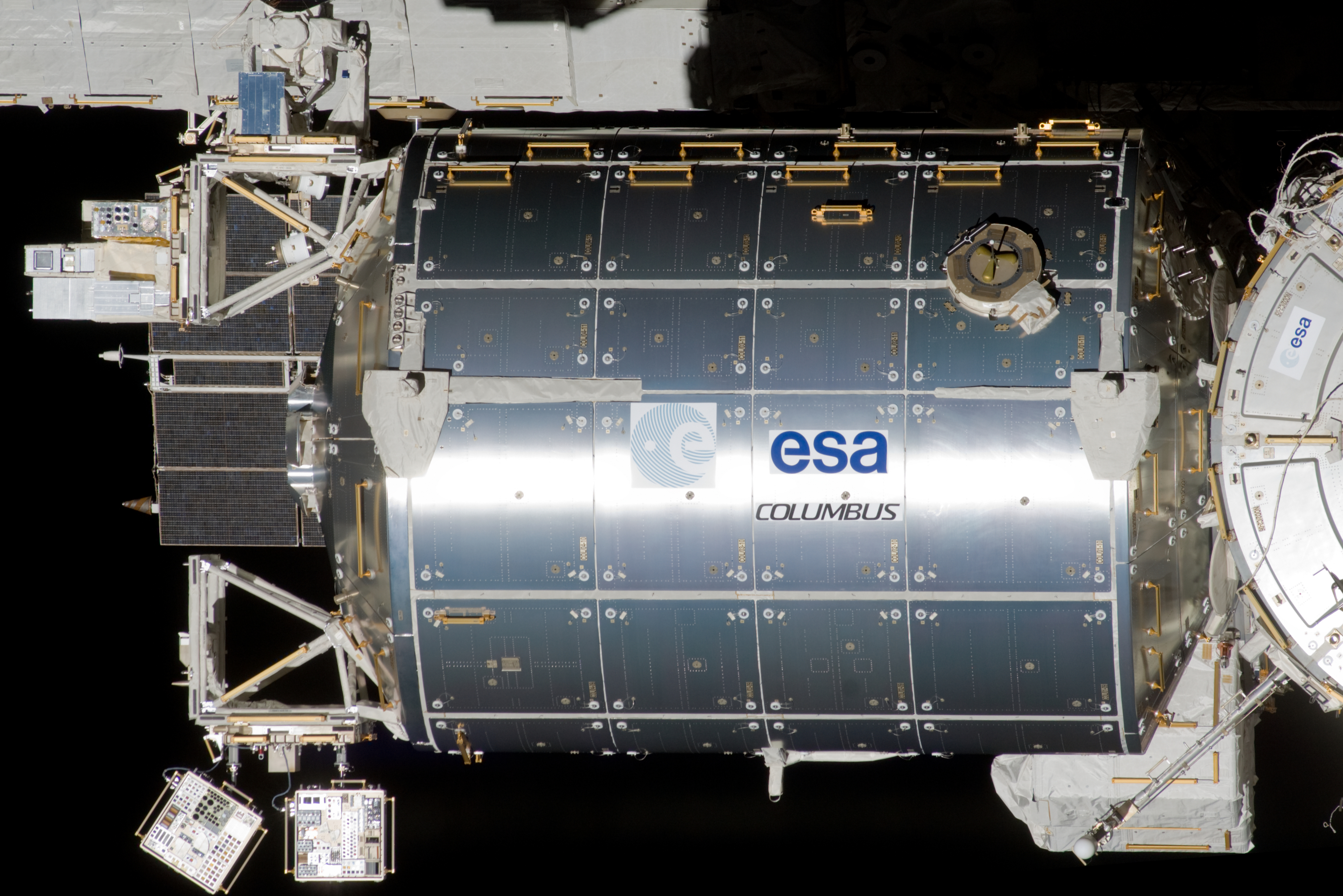
Columbus module

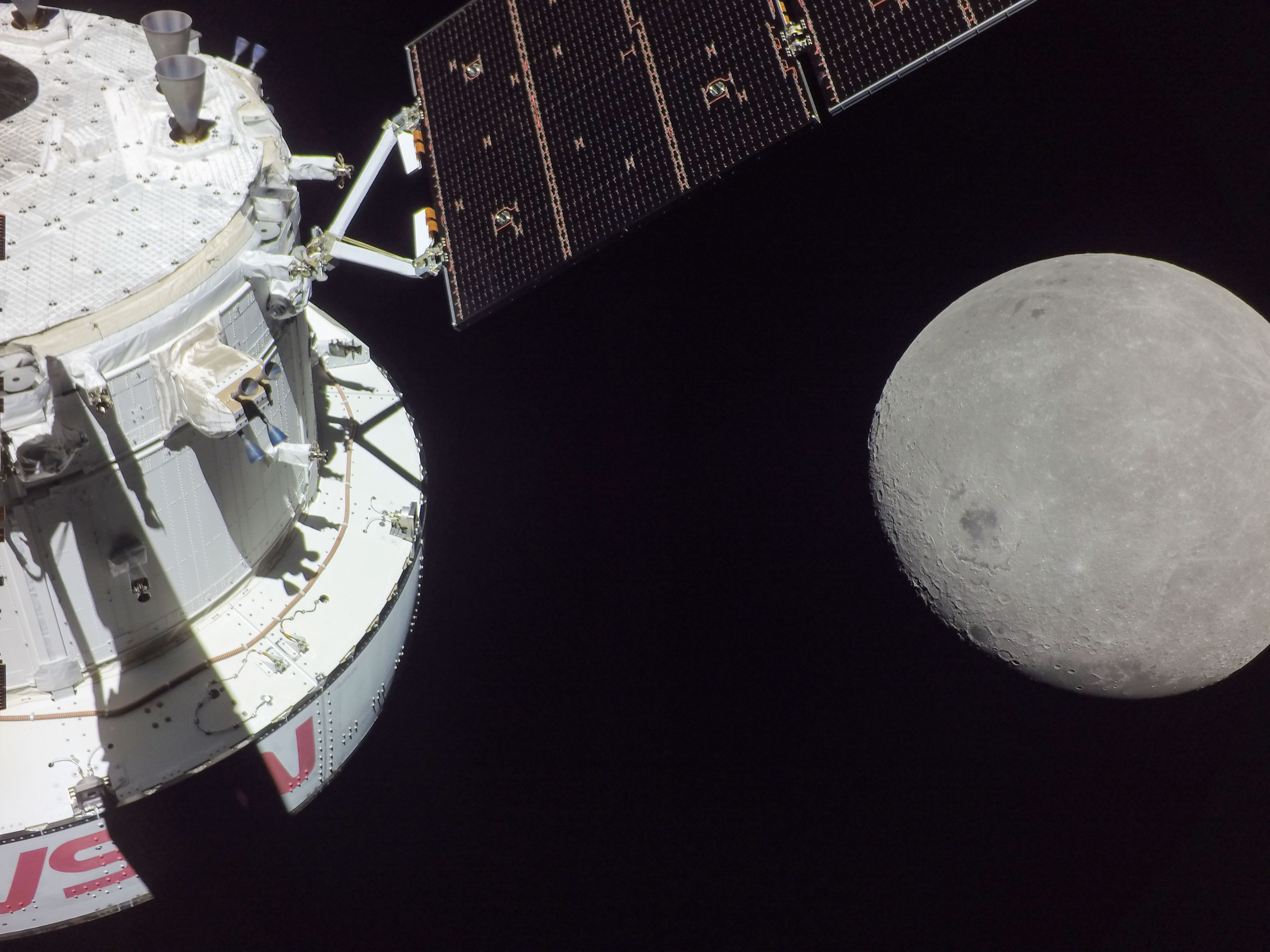
Artemis I: Orion and ESM near the Moon

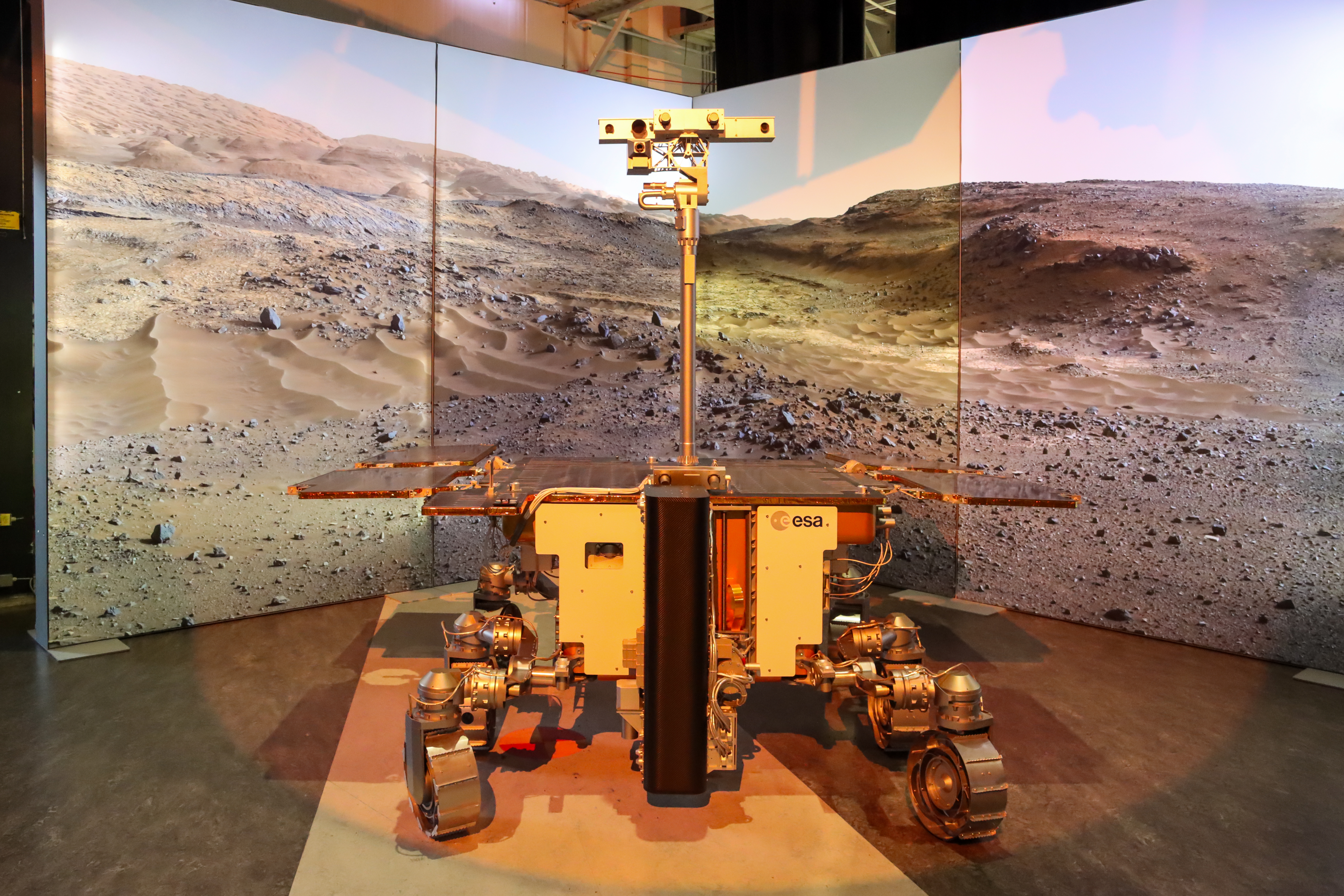
Model of Rosalind Franklin rover

=== Low Earth Orbit ===
- European contribution to the International Space Station
  - Columbus – ESA science laboratory on the International Space Station
  - Columbus-EPF – Part of the Columbus module on the International Space Station
  - Cupola – Observation module of the International Space Station
  - European Robotic Arm – Robotic arm installed on the ISS
- LEO Cargo Return Service – Space cargo vehicle development programme of the European Space Agency
  - Nyx – European reusable space capsule

=== Moon ===
- European Service Module – Primary power and propulsion component of the Orion spacecraft
- Argonaut – European Space Agency lunar lander
- Lunar Link – European lunar communications hardware

==== Payloads on non-ESA missions ====
- LandCam-X on Griffin Mission One
- MoonLIGHT Pointing Actuator on IM-3
- PLATE on Rashid 2
- PROSPECT on IM-4
- Rover Permittivity Sensor on Rashid 3
- EMS-L on LUPEX

==== Moon Explore (formerly Small Missions for Exploration) ====
- VMMO – CubeSat Lunar orbiter by ESA
- MAGPIE – European lunar rover
- Máni – European lunar mapping mission
- Moonraker – Proposed lunar LiDAR mapping mission
- MoonRAD – Proposed lunar orbiter for monitoring radiation

=== Mars ===
- ExoMars – Astrobiology programme of the European Space Agency
  - Trace Gas Orbiter – Mars orbiter, part of ExoMars programme
  - Rosalind Franklin rover – Planned Mars rover, part of ExoMars programme
- LightShip – Planned European interplanetary space tug supporting Mars missions
- Sample Transfer Arm – European robotic arm for space exploration

== History ==
In 2014, the ESA ministerial council adopted the "Resolution on Europe's space exploration strategy" addressing the three exploration destinations (LEO, the Moon, and Mars). In response to this document, ESA established the European Exploration Envelope Programme (E3P) in 2016 to bring together all the agency's space exploration activities focused on these destinations in a single programme. By incorporating the ExoMars programme as well as ESA's long-term human spaceflight ambitions, E3P effectively superseded the 2000s' Aurora programme.

The programme was renamed Terrae Novae in 2021 and in 2022, the agency published the detailed "Terrae Novae 2030+ Strategy Roadmap". The 2022 ESA ministerial council approved €2.7 billion for the next phase of Terrae Novae, including the Argonaut, a large robotic lunar lander. In 2023, the programme launched a call for proposals for small missions focused on lunar exploration (renamed "Moon Explore" in 2026).

During the 2020s, the Terrae Novae programme started developing two major space infrastructure projects for long term, sustainable robotic exploration of the Moon and Mars. The Argonaut landers will deliver heavy payloads to the lunar surface. The LightShip interplanetary space tugs equipped with solar electric propulsion will deliver other spacecraft to Mars and then serve as communication, navigation, and weather satellites within the MARCONI constellation in high Mars orbit. Additionally, the optional Advanced Research in Telecommunication Systems (ARTES) programme (not part of Terrae Novae) started developing the Moonlight Initiative intended to place a constellation of communication and navigation satellites around the Moon.

In 2025, the programme included the European contribution to the International Space Station (ISS) with European astronauts joining both long term ISS expeditions and short commercial missions, the European Service Module (ESM) of NASA's lunar Orion spacecraft, and the uncrewed astrobiology-focused Trace Gas Orbiter (TGO) studying the atmosphere of Mars, as well as development of numerous future missions, spacecraft, and technologies. At the ESA ministerial council in November 2025, the member states committed €2.9 billion for the programme, 20% less than the previously projected €3.7 billion.

Benjamin Haddad and Ursula von der Leyen with a crewed Nyx model at the International Space Summit in 2026

At the International Space Summit in September 2026, ESA awarded a LEO Cargo Return Service contract to The Exploration Company for up to three space station resupply flights of its Nyx reusable spacecraft, expected to launch for the first time on Ariane 6 no later than 2029. Also at the event, ESA deepened its relationship with three space station companies, Vast, Axiom Space, and Starlab Space, with agreements for another ISS flight and potential future utilization of their planned commercial space stations. At the summit, ESA member states signed a document expressing their interest in continuing human spaceflight to low Earth orbit after the expected decommissioning of ISS and calling on ESA to study options for strengthening European autonomy in this area, to be discussed at the upcoming Intermediate Ministerial Meeting in December 2026.

During 2026, ESA was investigating two general scenarios for the post-ISS future: utilizing commercial space stations under development, e.g., by Axiom Space, Starlab, and Vast, or developing a European-led space station based on existing European human spaceflight heritage like Columbus and ESM. To study the feasibility of the latter option, ESA awarded two contracts to Airbus Defence and Space and OHB in September 2026.

In October 2026, ESA Director General Josef Aschbacher estimated that development of a fully European system for launching astronauts to low Earth orbit would take 10 years and cost 10 billion Euro.

== See also ==
- List of European Space Agency programmes and missions
- Aurora programme – ESA human spaceflight programme from 2001
