= Aurora Project =

Aurora Project may refer to:

- Aurora Project, a fictional disease in the Blade: The Series
- Aurora programme, a human spaceflight programme of the European Space Agency
- Aurora (aircraft), a hypothesised United States reconnaissance aircraft
