= Rashid 3 =

Emirati lunar rover

- Operator: (United Arab Emirates) MBRSC

Spacecraft properties
- Spacecraft type: Lunar rover

Start of mission
- Launch date: 2029 (planned)
- Emirates Planetary Programme Emirates Lunar Mission

Rashid 3 is a future lunar rover under development by the Mohammed bin Rashid Space Centre (MBRSC) as the third rover of the Emirates Lunar Mission program. It is planned to be delivered to the Lunar south pole region in 2029. Its mission is to study geographic and geological features of the lunar surface and to search for water. It will carry seven Emirati and European scientific instruments.

== Instruments ==
=== Rover Permittivity Sensor ===
The Rover Permittivity Sensor suite (RPS) by the European Space Agency (ESA) uses electrodes on the rover's wheels for measuring the dielectric permittivity of the regolith to infer its ice content and density. It is based on the permittivity sensor in PROSPECT.

=== CAM-25 and CAM-8 ===
Two cameras with Multi-Spectral Filter Arrays for spectrally distinguishing between mineralogic features on the Moon, developed by CNES.

=== MoonIS ===
MoonIS, developed by the National Institute for Astrophysics (INAF) and the Italian Space Agency (ASI), is a VIS–IR spectrometer for collecting hyperspectral data in the range of 0.4 to 2.3 μm. It builds upon the technical heritage of the Mars Multispectral Imager for Subsurface Studies (Ma MISS) spectrometer on ESA's Rosalind Franklin rover.

=== Deep Regolith Sounder ===
The Deep Regolith Sounder (DRS) is an ultra-wideband ground-penetrating radar with a lightweight, flat, linearly polarized antenna mounted beneath the rover. Its goal is to characterize near-surface stratigraphy, detect subsurface ice and cavities, and map geological structures relevant to in situ resource utilization.

== See also ==
- Terrae Novae – European programme for human spaceflight and robotic space exploration
