= Jupiter (spacecraft) =

Proposed space tug spacecraft

Jupiter is a proposed space tug spacecraft concept by Lockheed Martin, which was initially conceptualized as a 2015 bid proposal to NASA for an International Space Station (ISS) cargo resupply services contract. The proposal was not accepted by NASA, and future Lockheed plans for the concept are unknown.

The conceptual spacecraft is designed to operate in orbit indefinitely, and be refueled from cargo pods delivered to the craft. Other proposed uses for the technology include on-orbit space tug services, according to company officials in a March 2015 presentation made in Washington, D.C.

== History ==
In 2014, Lockheed Martin proposed a cargo transport system called Jupiter to NASA under Phase 2 of a program to procure commercial cargo delivery services to the International Space Station after 2017. Lockheed publicly announced the program in March 2015, and released an overview of the spacecraft and space cargo services they envision. By October 2015, NASA had eliminated the Jupiter proposal from the shortlist of the remaining competitors.

== Description ==
The Jupiter space tug is intended to launch to space — conjoined with an Exoliner cargo container — on an Atlas V launch vehicle, and deliver the cargo container to the ISS. Once the cargo is unloaded, the Exoliner would be filled up with trash and other disposables, as is normal with the Orbital Sciences Cygnus, the European Space Agency (ESA) Automated Transfer Vehicle (ATV), and the JAXA H-II Transfer Vehicle (HTV). However, in contrast to the typical cargo resupply spacecraft built prior to 2015, the Jupiter tug is proposed to remain in orbit following the completion of the initial delivery, where it would be available to meet up with a subsequent Atlas V/Exoliner and repeat the process. As proposed, in that meet up, the Jupiter would exchange an Exoliner filled with trash for the follow-on Exoliner carrying fresh cargo, and the Atlas V second stage would deorbit the trash-filled container while Jupiter would shuttle the new container to the space station.

Jupiter is to be derived in part from designs of two earlier Lockheed Martin spacecraft:

- Mars Atmosphere and Volatile Evolution Mission (MAVEN), and the
- Juno spacecraft.

Jupiter is to include a robotic arm — which Lockheed intends to procure from MacDonald, Dettwiler and Associates (MDA) — based on MDA's earlier development of Canadarm, the robotic arm technology previously used on the Space Shuttle. In addition to the Jupiter space tug itself, the Lockheed concept includes the use of a new 4.4 m (14 ft)-diameter cargo transport module called Exoliner for carrying cargo to the ISS. Exoliner is based on the earlier ESA-developed Automated Transfer Vehicle, and is to be jointly developed with Thales Alenia Space.

== Commercial Resupply Services ==
On 12 March 2015, Lockheed Martin announced the spacecraft and its proposal for Commercial Resupply Services Phase 2, which utilized the vehicle. The proposal competes with Boeing's CST-100 capsule, Orbital ATK's Cygnus, and SpaceX's Dragon capsule proposals for the same contract. Similar to Orbital ATK's Cygnus, the system is not capable of bringing payload safely back to Earth. Lockheed's proposal, as of March 2015, is the only proposal for more than one spacecraft.

Lockheed Martin's proposal to the U.S. government uses the Jupiter in conjunction with the Exoliner cargo capsule. The first launch will include the Jupiter spacecraft launching along with a filled Exoliner cargo capsule. Once in orbit, Jupiter would be designed to perform maneuvers to approach the International Space Station. The Jupiter and Exoliner then will deliver cargo to, and carry trash from, the on-orbit facility. The combined unit will disconnect from the station and move away.

After these events, a new launch of the Exoliner cargo capsule is projected to occur. All launches after the first flight will deliver only Exoliner cargo capsules, assuming that the Jupiter spacecraft is in good health. The new craft would include fuel for Jupiter as well as cargo to be delivered to the space station. The arriving Exoliner will remain attached to the upper stage through a mounting ring. Jupiter and the departing Exoliner, now filled with trash, will approach the nearly spent rocket stage. The departing container will undock from the Jupiter spacecraft and will briefly be unattached to either the upper stage or the spacecraft. Immediately following the undocking, the arriving Exoliner docked to the upper stage will be removed by the Jupiter's robotic arm, and refastened onto the Jupiter. Finally, the departing container will be moved to the docking system on the upper stage of the rocket. After the Jupiter and Exoliner move away, the rocket stage will guide the used cargo pod down for a destructive reentry.

Fuel within the new cargo unit will transfer to the Jupiter spacecraft by unannounced means to keep the tug fueled. The refueled spacecraft will then tug the new cargo unit to the space station. Jupiter is planned to last indefinitely in orbit.

Lockheed Martin's goal is to launch a single Jupiter, which will be reused for each on-orbit delivery, and the ostensibly less expensive cargo units would be expended through atmospheric reentry. Jupiter is projected to maintain fuel over its lifespan due to the fuel transfer during each Jupiter-Exoliner rendezvous.
