= Máni (spacecraft) =

European lunar mapping mission

- Mission type: Selenography
- Operator: European Space Agency (Denmark) University of Copenhagen
- Website: mani-mission.ku.dk/english
- Mission duration: 3 years (planned)

Spacecraft properties
- Manufacturer: Space Inventor

Start of mission
- Launch date: 2029 (planned)

Orbital parameters
- Reference system: Selenocentric
- Regime: Polar orbit
- Altitude: 50 km
- Inclination: > 89 degrees

Máni is a future lunar orbiter under development by the European Space Agency (ESA) and the University of Copenhagen in Denmark. Máni's mission is to provide detailed topography maps of the lunar surface for use in the planning of crewed and uncrewed lunar landing missions. The only primary instrument of the mission is a lunar mapping telescope. This will be Denmark's first lunar mission. It is named after Máni, the personified Moon in Germanic mythology. Its launch is planned for 2029.

== Background ==
Máni was one the proposals supported by ESA's Terrae Novae programme under the "Small Missions Call" between 2023 and 2025. It was selected for implementation on 16 December 2025. The mission is being developed by an international consortium led by University of Copenhagen which includes industrial partners from Denmark, Poland, the Netherlands, and Slovenia (Paradigma Technologies) and academic partners from Denmark (Aalborg University, Aarhus University, University of Southern Denmark, Danish Meteorological Institute), France (Université Paris-Saclay), and Poland (Polish Academy of Sciences). The mission's leader is Jens Frydenvang, associate professor at University of Copenhagen. The spacecraft is being built by the mission's main industrial partner, the Danish satellite manufacturer Space Inventor. The mission's total budget is around 50 million Euro, from which the Danish government provides up to 130 million Danish crowns.

== Spacecraft ==
The Máni spacecraft is of a compact rectangular design in order to minimize moment of inertia and allow for the agility needed for numerous observation angles. It has mass of around 210 kg and dimensions of 0.85 x 0.85 x 0.75 m with its two solar panels closed and 2.5 x 0.85 x 0.75 m when operational. It will be placed on 50 km polar orbit around the Moon with inclination of more than 89° which requires a lot of orbit maintenance manoeuvres. It will be equipped with both chemical and electric propulsion systems. The primary optical payload, supplied by the Polish company Scanway, is based on an Earth observation design developed under ESA InCubed project SEMOVIS.

== See also ==
- List of European Space Agency programmes and missions
