= Exotrail =

French satellite launch company

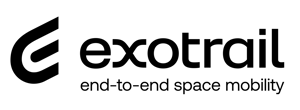
- Company type: Private
- Industry: Aerospace industry; Space technology
- Founded: 2017
- Founders: Jean-Luc Maria; Paul Lascombes; David Henri; Nicolas Heitz
- Headquarters: Palaiseau, Île-de-France, France
- Products: Electric propulsion systems for small satellites; Orbital transfer vehicle (SpaceVan)
- Subsidiaries: Exotrail U.S. subsidiaries (2)

Exotrail is a space service company from Palaiseau, Ile-de-France, France, founded by Jean-Luc Maria, Paul Lascombes, David Henri and Nicolas Heitz in 2017. The company produces electric propulsion systems used in small satellites. The company also develops an hosting vehicle (an orbital transfer vehicle or space tug) – SpaceVan – for small satellites. It has two U.S. subsidiaries.

An initial funding round raised €3.5 million, enabling the company to hire around twenty employees. In February 2023, the company raised $58 million to scale up production. By June 2025, Exotrail had grown to approximately 200 staff members and was continuing its development using its own funds.

Exotrail tests its propulsion systems in large vacuum chambers designed to replicate the conditions encountered in space. It enables precise adjustment of thrust levels. Produced by gas expulsion, the thrust allows satellites to manoeuvre, reach and modify specific orbits, and ultimately re-enter the atmosphere for controlled deorbiting and disintegration. To reduce costs, Exotrail sources certain components outside the traditional space industry, where equipment is often priced at a premium due to stringent qualification requirements.
