= IM-4 =

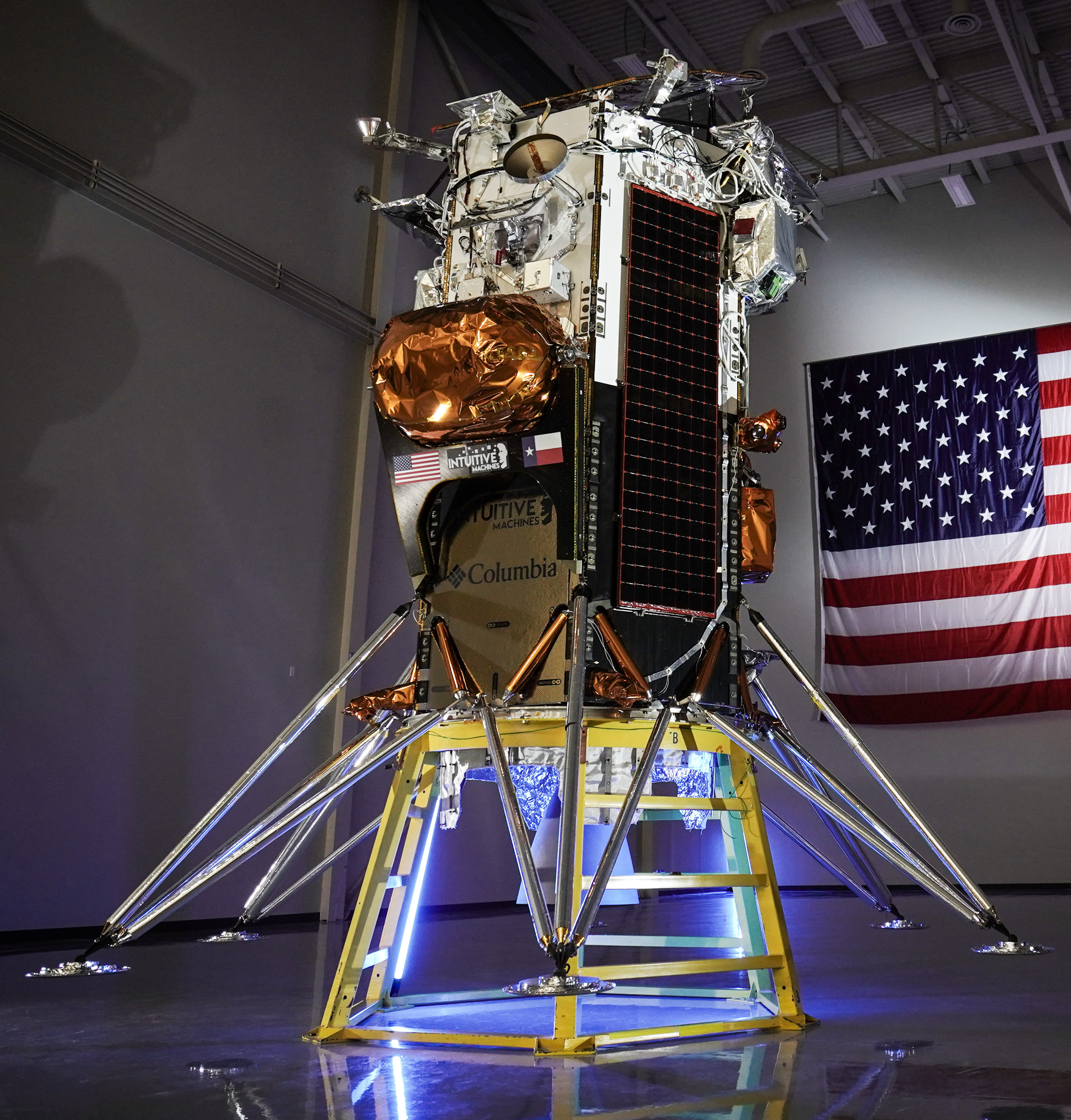
- IM-1 Odysseus, a Nova-C lander similar to IM-4
- Names: IM-4; CP-22; CLPS CP-22
- Mission type: Lunar landing
- Operator: Intuitive Machines

Spacecraft properties
- Spacecraft type: Nova-C
- Manufacturer: Intuitive Machines

Start of mission
- Launch date: 2027
- Rocket: Falcon 9

Lunar lander
- Landing site: Mons Mouton

IM-4 is a robotic lunar lander and lunar satellite mission being developed by Intuitive Machines as part of NASA's Commercial Lunar Payload Services (CLPS) program. It is planned to launch in 2027.

== Overview ==
IM-4 will launch on a Falcon 9 launch vehicle at Kennedy Space Center in 2027. The mission will deploy a Nova-C class lander to the Mons Mouton plateau near the lunar south pole, and two communications satellites in lunar orbit as part of the LunaNet project, providing communication relays in the Artemis missions. The lander will deliver eight payloads, including a drill, and will perform in-situ tests of the lunar regolith, searching for the presence of volatile compounds and water.

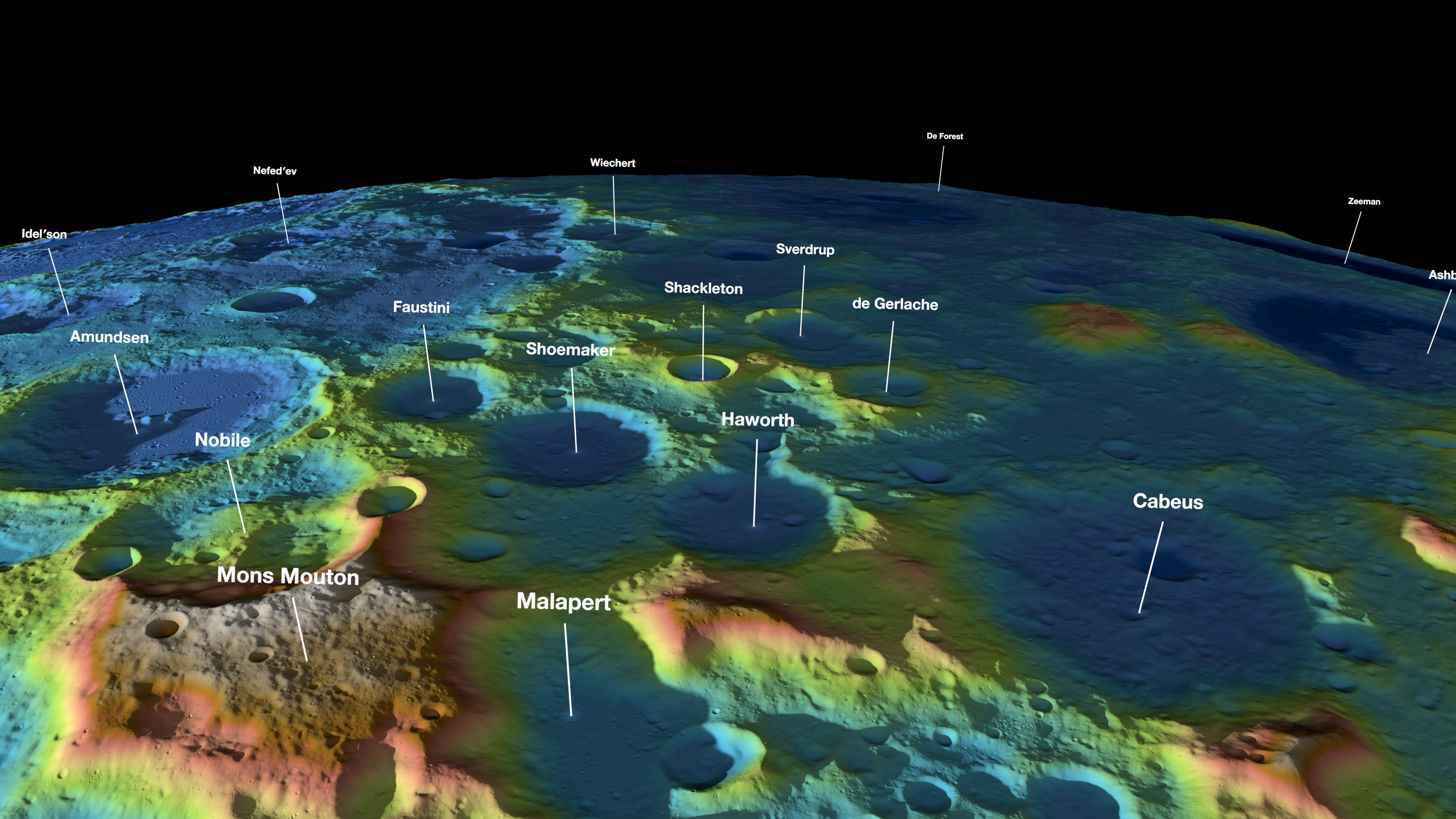
The Mons Mouton plateau (lower left) shown on a topographic map

== Equipment and payloads ==
The PROSPECT drill suite, developed by ESA, is designed to collect samples up to 1 metre (3.3 ft) beneath the lunar surface with the PROseed drill, and perform testing with the ProSPA module. The suite is aimed at identifying the presence of volatile compounds and water.

The RISE (Regolith Impact Stiffness Experiment with Orb Drops on Lunar Surface) experiment developed by the Japanese space agency JAXA consists of a ball-shaped probe carrying an accelerometer. RISE will be released from the IM-4 lander, and its motion will be monitored as it impacts the lunar surface regolith.

The Australian company Advanced navigation developed the LUNA (Laser Unit for Navigation Aid) device, which will help the spacecraft's computer determine altitude and velocity during the landing. The Mons Mouton plateau has permanently shadowed dark areas which can cause standard automated landing systems to be less reliable.

== History ==
The IM-2 Athena mission touched down on Mons Mouton on 6 March 2025, however it flipped over after a rough landing. The sideways orientation meant its solar panels were not facing the sun, preventing the use of its drill. The mission was considered largely a failure, with few meaningful scientific experiments being performed. As of 13 October 2026, no launch date or exact landing coordinates of IM-4 have been published.

== See also ==
- List of missions to the Moon
- Terrae Novae – European programme for human spaceflight and robotic space exploration
