= RadCube =

European CubeSat for demonstrating space weather-related technologies

- Mission type: space weather, technology demonstration
- Operator: European Space Agency
- COSPAR ID: 2021-073B
- SATCAT no.: 49067

Spacecraft properties
- Spacecraft type: 3U CubeSat
- Manufacturer: (Hungary) C3S (Hungary) Centre for Energy Research (United Kingdom) Imperial College (Poland) Astronika

Start of mission
- Launch date: 17 August 2021
- Rocket: Vega

End of mission
- Disposal: deorbited
- Declared: 20 August 2024

RadCube was a technology demonstration CubeSat for space weather monitoring technologies, operated by the European Space Agency (ESA) in low Earth orbit between 2021 and 2024. The satellite was constructed by the Hungarian company C3S with contributions from the Hungarian Centre for Energy Research, the UK's Imperial College, and the Polish company Astronika. The satellite successfully demonstrated its radiation telescope (by Centre for Energy Research), its set of "MAGIC" magnetometer sensors (by Imperial College), and its extendable boom (by Astronika). The MAGIC magnetometer will be implemented on future space missions including HENON, ESA's first stand-alone deep space CubeSat.

== See also ==
- List of European Space Agency programmes and missions
- MoonRAD – Proposed European lunar orbiter mission
