= MoonRAD =

Proposed European lunar orbiter mission

- Mission type: Space weather
- Operator: European Space Agency
- Website: www.moonrad.space

Spacecraft properties
- Manufacturer: (Hungary) REMRED

Orbital parameters
- Reference system: Selenocentric

MoonRAD is a proposed European lunar orbiter mission for monitoring radiation, energetic particles, and plasma environment around the Moon. Its goal is to provide data for improving space weather models and protecting astronauts, spacecraft, and lunar infrastructure from radiation. The mission is being developed by a consortium led by the Hungarian company REMRED. The HUN-REN Centre for Energy Research is responsible for the mission's science aspects. In 2026, the MoonRAD mission proposal was selected by the European Space Agency (ESA) for study under the Terrae Novae programme's Moon Explore initiative.

== See also ==
- List of European Space Agency programmes and missions
- RadCube – European CubeSat for demonstrating space weather-related technologies
