= Space tug =

Spacecraft used to transfer cargo from one orbit to another

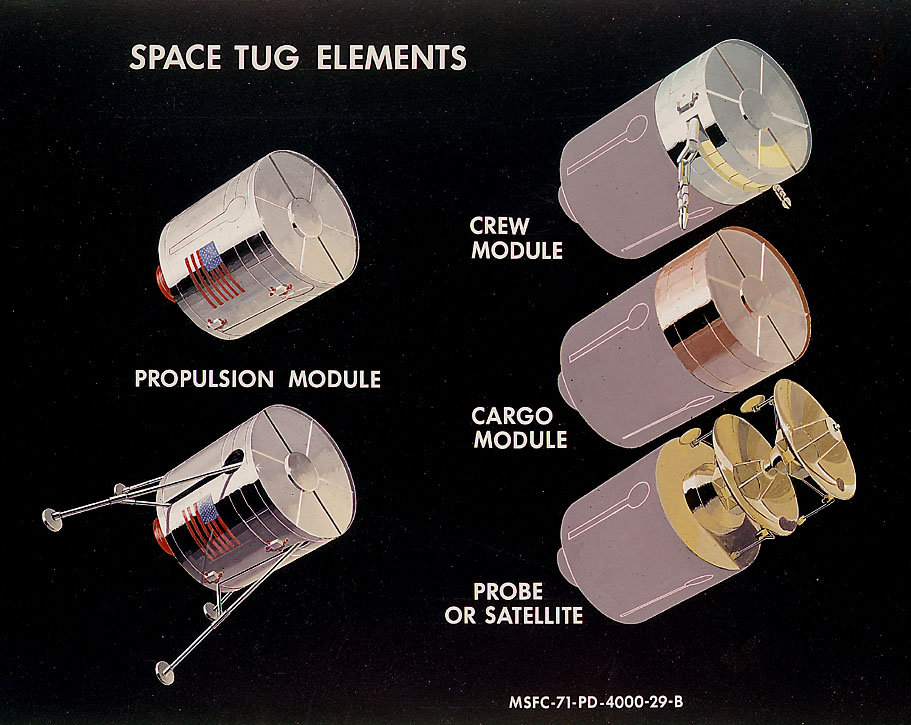
Reusable, modular 1969 NASA vision Space Tug (canceled)

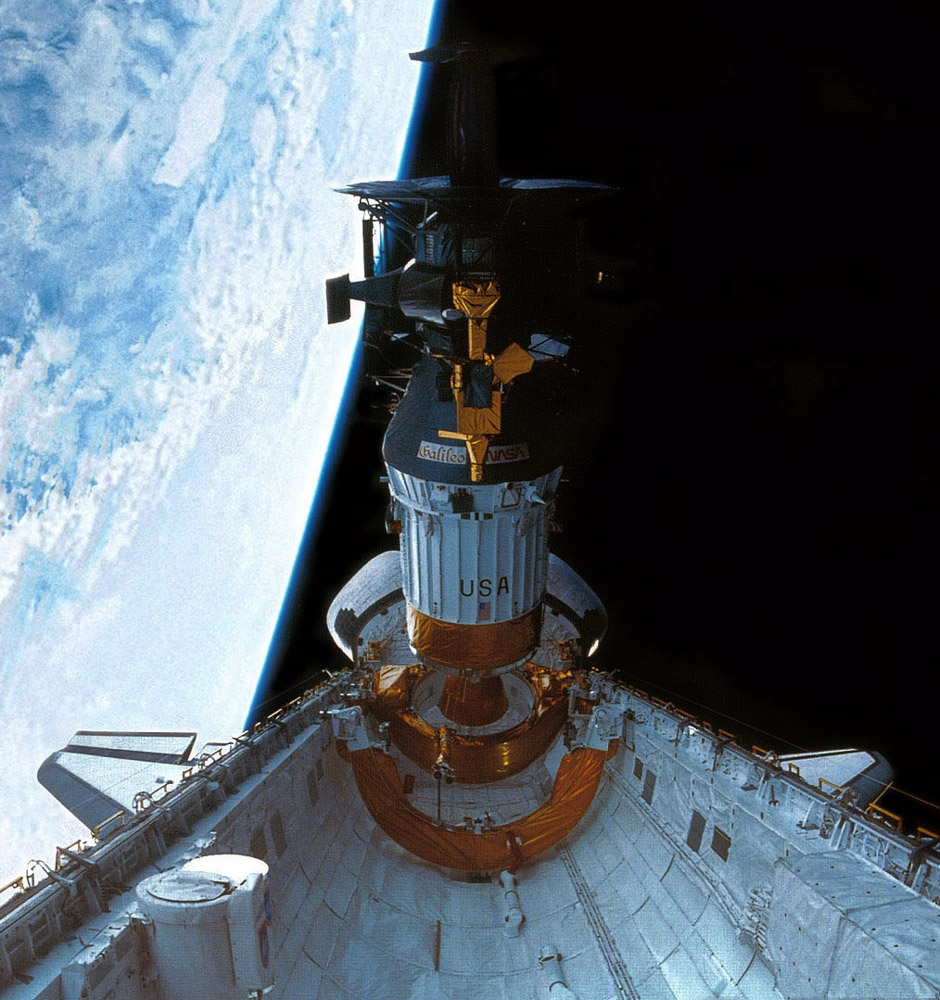
The Jupiter bound Galileo spacecraft and its attached Inertial Upper Stage (IUS) being deployed after being launched by the Space Shuttle Atlantis on the STS-34 mission. The IUS was an optional payload for missions where the Space Shuttle was used to take a payload beyond Low Earth Orbit. By contrast, the Space Shuttle external tank was always included and used whenever a shuttle launch took place.

A space tug is a type of spacecraft used to transfer spaceborne cargo from one orbit to another orbit with different energy characteristics. The term can include expendable upper stages or spacecraft that are not necessarily a part of their launch vehicle. However, it can also refer to a spacecraft that transports payload already in space to another location in outer space, such as in the Space Transportation System concept. An example would be moving a spacecraft from a low Earth orbit (LEO) to a higher-energy orbit like a geostationary transfer orbit, a lunar transfer, or an escape trajectory.

The term is often used to refer to reusable, space-based vehicles. Some previously proposed or built space tugs include the NASA 1970s STS proposal or the proposed Russian Parom, and has sometimes been used to refer to expendable upper stages, such as Fregat, Spaceflight Industries Sherpa, and the Inertial Upper Stage, when such stages are optional.

== Background ==
The space tug was first envisioned in the post-World War II era as a support vehicle for a permanent, Earth-orbiting space station. It was used by science fiction writer Murray Leinster as the title of a novel published in 1953 as the sequel to Space Platform, another novel about such a space station.

== Existing space tugs ==
Space tugs can be roughly categorised into a few types:

- Large tugs that dock with satellites in orbit which may be able to perform services like refuelling or repairs or enhancements as well as changing the satellites orbit whether that is to extend life of satellite or to deorbit it.
- Optional rocket kick stages used to place some payloads into higher orbits. An example would be Photon Satellite Bus but this might just be considered part of the rocket system rather than a space tug and this article does not really consider these in detail.
- Smaller tugs that are mainly cubesat deployers with some propulsion to deploy the cubesats to different orbits.

=== Large tugs that dock ===
==== Mission Extension Vehicle ====
In 2011 ViviSat a joint project between U.S. Space and ATK proposed the Mission Extension Vehicle. In 2016 ViviSat was dissolved when U.S. Space declared bankruptcy and ATK merged with Orbital Science Corporation to form Orbital ATK. In 2017 Orbital ATK got the go ahead from the FCC to begin development of the spacecraft with new partner Northrop Grumman who was developing a tug of their own. In June 2018, both companies pooled their resources and merged to form a new company called Northrop Grumman Innovation Systems. On October 9, 2019, the first of these tugs MEV-1 was launched from Baikonur Cosmodrome in Kazakhstan on a Proton-M rocket. In February 2020, MEV-1 successfully docked with Intelsat 901 and returned it to geosynchronous orbit, allowing it to continue operating 4 years past its service life. MEV-1 will continue to maintain this position for a 5-year period, after which it will move the satellite back into a graveyard orbit for retirement. MEV-2 was launched August 15, 2020, with Galaxy 30 on an Ariane 5 to perform a similar maneuver with Intelsat-1002.

==== Shijian-21 ====
In December 2021 - January 2022, China's Shijian-21 space debris mitigation satellite has docked with the defunct Beidou-2 G2 navigation satellite to drastically alter its geostationary orbit, demonstrating capabilities only previously exhibited by the United States.

=== Smaller tugs and dispensers ===
==== SHERPA ====
Spaceflight Inc. developed SHERPA, which builds upon the capabilities of the Spaceflight Secondary Payload System (SSPS) by incorporating propulsion and power generation subsystems, which creates a propulsive tug dedicated to maneuvering to an optimal orbit to place secondary and hosted payloads. The maiden flight of two separate unpropelled variants of the dispenser was in December 2018 on a Falcon 9 rocket. This flight deployed 64 small satellites from 17 countries.

==== ION Satellite Carrier ====
D-Orbit, an Italian space logistics and transportation company, developed the InOrbit NOW ION Satellite Carrier. The first launch occurred on September 3, 2020, on a Vega rocket, but subsequent launches have all been on SpaceX Falcon 9 Transporter missions. On January 3, 2023, the company launched its seventh and eighth vehicles, Second star to the right, aboard the SpaceX Transporter-6 Mission.

==== Long Duration Propulsive ESPA (LDPE) ====
LDPE is based on a Northrop Grumman payload adapter used to help attach the upper stage to the main satellite in addition to hosting a few slots for other smallsats. However, the entire system is powered by the ESPAStar satellite bus, which is in charge of power consumption and distribution as well as propulsion making it a fully operational space tug capable of deploying different payloads at different orbits. ESPAStar has the capability to host 6 smallsat payloads totaling 1,920 kg (4,230 lb). The system is also able to provide 400 meters per second of delta-V via a Hydrazine propulsion module.

The first LDPE was launched on December 7, 2021, on an Atlas V rocket as part of the STP-3 mission. The second launch was on November 1, 2022, on a Falcon Heavy rocket as part of the USSF-44 mission. A third mission was on January 15, 2023, on USSF-67 mission.

==== Vigoride by Momentus Space ====
Momentus Space develops different space tug versions focusing on large velocity changes over 1 km/s. Two demonstration missions of their Vigoride platform took place on May 25, 2022, and January 3, 2023 with key tests occurring through 2022. Momentus Space became widely known in October 2020 when it reached a SPAC investment deal with Stable Road Acquisition Corp valuing the combined entity at over $1 billion.

==== Epic Aerospace ====
Epic Aerospace's Chimera LEO 1 launched on January 3, 2023.

==== Launcher ====
Reports surfaced circa June 15, 2021, of Launcher's Orbiter space tug. Launching on its own rocket as well as SpaceX’s Falcon 9 it provides 150 kilograms of payload, either 90 units of CubeSat or else larger satellites using standard smallsat separation systems. With a chemical propulsion system using ethylene and nitrous oxide propellants it is capable of 500 meters per second of delta-v, more with additional propellant tanks. Orbiter SN1 launched on January 3, 2023. After Launcher was acquired by VAST, the Orbiter program was cancelled.

==== Impulse Space ====
Impulse Space successfully launched Mira, a 300 kg (660 lb) space tug, on SpaceX's Transporter-9 mission in November 2023, deploying satellites and performing tests of its propulsion system. Future missions are planned for Transporter-11 and Transporter-12.

== Early Concepts - NASA Space Transportation System ==
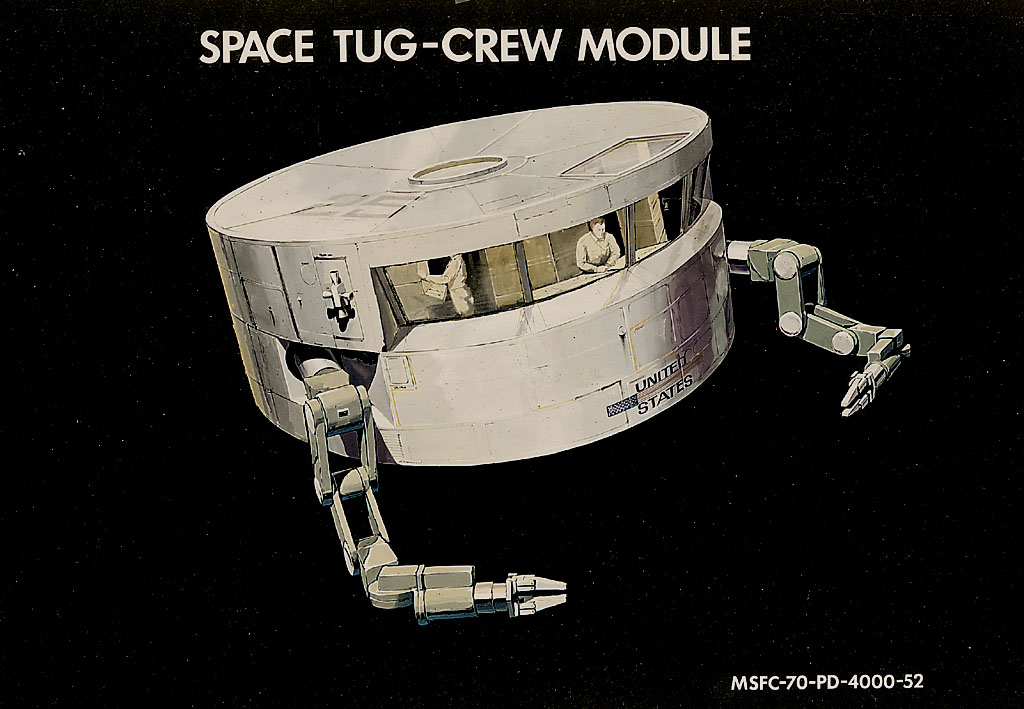
Space Tug crew module concept

A reusable space tug was studied by NASA in the late 60s and early 70s as part of a reusable Space Transportation System (STS). This consisted of a basic propulsion module, to which a crew module or other payload could be attached. Optional legs could be added to land payloads on the surface of the Moon. This, along with all other elements of STS except the Space Shuttle, was never funded after cutbacks to NASA's budget during the 1970s in the wake of the Apollo program.

== Space Shuttle era ==
=== Expendable upper stages ===
The Shuttle program filled the role of high-energy orbital transfer by the development of a solid-fueled single-stage Payload Assist Module and two-stage Inertial Upper Stage.

A more powerful liquid hydrogen fueled Centaur-G stage was developed for use on the Shuttle, but was cancelled as too dangerous after the Challenger disaster.

=== Orbital Maneuvering Vehicle ===
NASA studied another space tug design, termed the Orbital Maneuvering Vehicle (OMV), along with its plans for Space Station Freedom. The OMV's role would have been a reusable space vehicle that would retrieve satellites, such as Hubble, and bring them to Freedom for repair or retrieval, or to service uncrewed orbital platforms. In 1984, the Orbital Maneuvering Vehicle (OMV) preliminary design studies were initiated through a competitive award process with systems studies conducted by TRW, Martin Marietta Aerospace, and LTV Corporation.

== Twenty-first century proposals ==
=== Parom ===
The Russian RKK Energia corporation proposed a space tug named Parom in 2005 which could be used to ferry both the proposed Kliper crew vehicle or uncrewed cargo and fuel resupply modules to ISS. Keeping the tug in space would have allowed for a less massive Kliper, enabling launch on a smaller booster than the original Kliper design.

=== VASIMR ===
The VASIMR electric plasma rocket could be used to power a high-efficiency space tug, using only 9 tons of Argon propellant to make a round trip to the Moon, delivering 34 tons of cargo from Low Earth Orbit to low lunar orbit. As of 2014, Ad Astra Rocket Company had put forward a concept proposal to utilize the technology to make a space tug.

=== PAM-G ===
ISRO has built an upper stage called PAM-G (Payload Assist Module for Geosynchronous Satellite Launch Vehicle) capable of pushing payloads directly to MEO or GEO orbits from low Earth orbits. PAM-G is powered by hypergolic liquid motor with restart capability, derived from Polar Satellite Launch Vehicle's fourth stage. As of 2013, ISRO has realized the structure, control systems, and motors of PAM-G and has conducted hot tests. PAM-G would form the fourth stage of GSLV Mk2C launch vehicle, sitting on top of GSLV's cryogenic third stage.

=== Jupiter ===
Lockheed Martin made a concept proposal to NASA in 2015 for a design called the Jupiter space tug, to be based on the designs of two earlier Lockheed Martin spacecraft—Mars Atmosphere and Volatile Evolution Mission and the Juno—as well as a robotic arm from MDA derived from technology used on Canadarm, the robotic arm technology previously used on the Space Shuttle. In addition to the Jupiter space tug itself, the Lockheed concept included the use of a new 4.4 m (14 ft)-diameter cargo transport module called Exoliner for carrying cargo to the ISS. Exoliner is based on the earlier (2000s) ESA-developed Automated Transfer Vehicle, and was to be jointly developed with Thales Alenia Space. In the event, NASA did not agree to fund the Jupiter development, and Lockheed Martin is not developing the tug with private capital.

=== Artemis Transfer Stages ===
One of NASA's Artemis Program's proposed lunar landers is a partially reusable three stage design. One of its main elements is a transfer stage to move the lander from the Lunar Gateway's orbit to a low lunar orbit. Future versions should be able to return to the Gateway for refueling and reuse with another lander. Northrop Grumman has proposed building this transfer stage based on its Cygnus spacecraft. NASA chose to select a different approach in April 2021.

=== Moon Cruiser ===
Designed by Airbus, the Moon Cruiser is a conceptual lunar logistics vehicle based on the ATV and ESM that is proposed to be used to support the international Lunar Gateway. If funded, it would make up a part of ESA's contribution to the Lunar Gateway program. As of January 2020, it was in the early design process. Planned to be launched on the Ariane 6—with the capability to also be launched with US heavy launchers—the vehicle is intended to be able to refuel lunar landers and deliver cargo to the Gateway. It will also be used to deliver the European ESPRIT module to the Gateway no earlier than 2025. It has also been proposed to turn the vehicle into a transfer stage for a lunar lander. Concepts for a lander variant of the vehicle exist but have not received funding.

=== Skyrora Space Tug ===
British launch vehicle manufacturer Skyrora shared details of their Space Tug in 2021, revealing it to be usable as the third stage of their Skyrora XL rocket. The company shared a video of the Space Tug undergoing a live test in January 2021. As well as being able to move a satellite from one orbit to another the Space Tug can perform a number of in-space operations including space debris removal.

=== Exotrail SpaceVan Orbital Transfer Vehicle ===
Exotrail unveils the April 12, 2022, of Orbital Transfer Vehicle, SpaceVan. The debut SpaceVan mission launched on board a Falcon 9 during the Transporter-9 rideshare mission on November 11th 2023, following a launch service agreement signed between Exotrail and SpaceX. At least three subsequent missions are planned throughout 2024 onboard multiple different launchers.

=== Impulse Space Helios ===
In addition to their currently flying Mira vehicle, Impulse Space is developing a far larger vehicle called Helios designed to carry 4,000 kg (8,800 lb) to 5,000 kg (11,000 lb) payloads directly to geosynchronous orbit. A first launch is planned for 2026.

=== Atomos Space ===
In January 2022, Atomos Space announced it had raised $5 million it had been trying to raise since 2020. Atomos plans to launch two of its Quark reusable orbital transfer vehicle in 2023.

=== Firefly Aerospace ===
Firefly Aerospace is developing an OTV called the Elytra that will fly on its Alpha rocket in 2024.

=== Space Machine's Optimus ===
In October 2022 Space Machines announced a deal with Arianespace to produce Optimus-1 a 270 kg space tug aiming to launch on SpaceX Falcon 9 in Q2 2023.

=== Exolaunch's Reliant tugs ===
Exolaunch Reliant tugs have standard and pro versions. Testing and flight qualification was planned to begin in 2022 on SpaceX's rideshare missions.

=== Astroscale's Lexi ===
Astroscale is developing Life Extension In-orbit (LEXI).

=== Orbit Fab ===
Orbit fab is attempting to develop an in-space propellant supply chain aiming to provide 'Gas Stations in Space'. On January 11, 2022, it was announced they had reached an agreement to refuel Astroscale's LEXI.

=== ULA Common Centaur as a SpaceTug ===
The Flexible Lunar Architecture for Exploration (FLARE) is a concept to deliver four crew to the lunar surface for a minimum of seven days and then return them safely to Earth. A key component of FLARE is the modified ULA Common Centaur used as a SpaceTug to deliver an uncrewed human lander to lunar orbit and to assist NASA's Orion capsule returning crew to Earth

=== Pushpak OTV ===
On October 9, 2024, Indian space startup Bellatrix Aerospace and NewSpace India Limited signed a contract for the integration of Pushpak Orbital Transfer Vehicles (OTV) for upcoming launch missions. With the ability to move satellites into other orbits with more accuracy and efficiency, Pushpak OTV is made for in-orbit maneuvering. According to Bellatrix Aerospace, launching a satellite on a specialized launch vehicle for micro and nano satellites costs about $45,000/kg; if launched on a Pushpak, the cost drops to $25,000/kg for low earth orbit. Additionally, it can facilitate future deep space missions, inclination changes, GEO transfer missions, and multi-orbit deployment sequences. Pushpak OTV to assist small satellites and CubeSats to reach their orbits. The first launch is planned in 2026.

=== LightShip ===
European Space Agency (ESA) is developing an interplanetary space tug named LightShip, equipped with solar electric propulsion, that will transport other spacecraft to vicinity of Mars and then serve as a communication satellite.

== See also ==
- Satellite dispenser
- Service module – Spacecraft compartment
- Multistage rocket
  - Three-stage-to-orbit
  - Two-stage-to-orbit
  - Single-stage-to-orbit
- Apogee kick motor – Rocket motor used to circularise a satellite's orbit after launch
- Rocket Lab Photon – Satellite bus made by Rocket Lab
- Blue Ring – Space tug and satellite platform

== Sources ==
- NASA Report, Technical Study for the Use of the Saturn 5, INT-21 and Other Saturn 5 Derivatives to Determine an Optimum Fourth Stage (space tug). Volume 1: Technical Volume, Book 1.

== Bibliography ==
- Wade, Mark. "Space Tug". Encyclopedia Astronautica. Archived from the original on July 2, 2002.
