= LightShip (spacecraft) =

Planned European interplanetary space tug supporting Mars missions

- Operator: European Space Agency
- Applications: Mars payload delivery and support

Specifications
- Spacecraft type: Uncrewed space tug

Production
- Status: Proposed
- Built: None
- Maiden launch: 2032 (planned)

LightShip is a proposed class of uncrewed interplanetary spacecraft under development by the European Space Agency (ESA) that will serve as a space tug for transporting payloads to Mars and provide communication, navigation, and weather monitoring services from a high Mars orbit. It will use its onboard solar electric propulsion to transport other spacecraft to vicinity of Mars and after the payload separates, LightShip will move to a high orbit of nearly 6000 km above the surface to form part of the Mars Communication and Navigation Infrastructure (MARCONI).

== Name ==
It is named after a lightship—a ship that acts as a lighthouse. ESA specifically cites the East Goodwin lightship whose captain sent the first radio distress signal using Guglielmo Marconi's wireless technology in 1899.

== Missions ==
If approved, the first LightShip mission will take place in 2032. Subsequent launch windows open in 2035 and 2037.

=== LightShip-1 and SpotLight ===
The first mission of LightShip will deliver a Mars surface-imaging orbiter called SpotLight. Its primary payload will be high resolution and medium-resolution context cameras. SpotLight will separate from LightShip-1 during the interplanetary cruise and enter Martian orbit using its own propulsion. LightShip-1 will then enter into its own operational orbit to demonstrate its MARCONI communications and navigation systems.

== See also ==
- List of European Space Agency programmes and missions
- Lightvessel stations of Great Britain
