= PROSPECT (lunar experiment) =

European instrument package for Lunar drilling

- Operator: European Space Agency
- Manufacturer: (Italy) Leonardo S.p.A. (United Kingdom) Open University
- Instrument type: Lunar drill
- Function: Volatiles prospecting

Host spacecraft
- Spacecraft: Nova-C IM-4
- Launch date: 2027 (planned)

PROSPECT (Package for Resource Observation and in-Situ Prospecting for Exploration, Commercial exploitation, and Transportation) is a package of instruments developed by the European Space Agency (ESA) for drilling into the surface of the Moon and searching for water ice and other volatiles. It consists of two principal components: the ProSEED drilling system designed to reach 1 meter below surface of Lunar regolith and the ProSPA miniaturized laboratory for analyzing the samples. PROSPECT is expected to be delivered to the south polar region of the Moon in 2027 aboard the IM-4 mission of Intutive Machines Nova-C lander, supported by NASA's CLPS programme. It was originally planned to fly on Russia's Luna 27 lander, but that collaboration was cancelled by ESA after the 2022 Russian invasion of Ukraine.

== See also ==
- List of European Space Agency programmes and missions
- Terrae Novae – European programme for human spaceflight and robotic space exploration
- MoonLIGHT Pointing Actuator – European Lunar laser ranging instrument
