= Aurora programme =

ESA human spaceflight programme from 2001

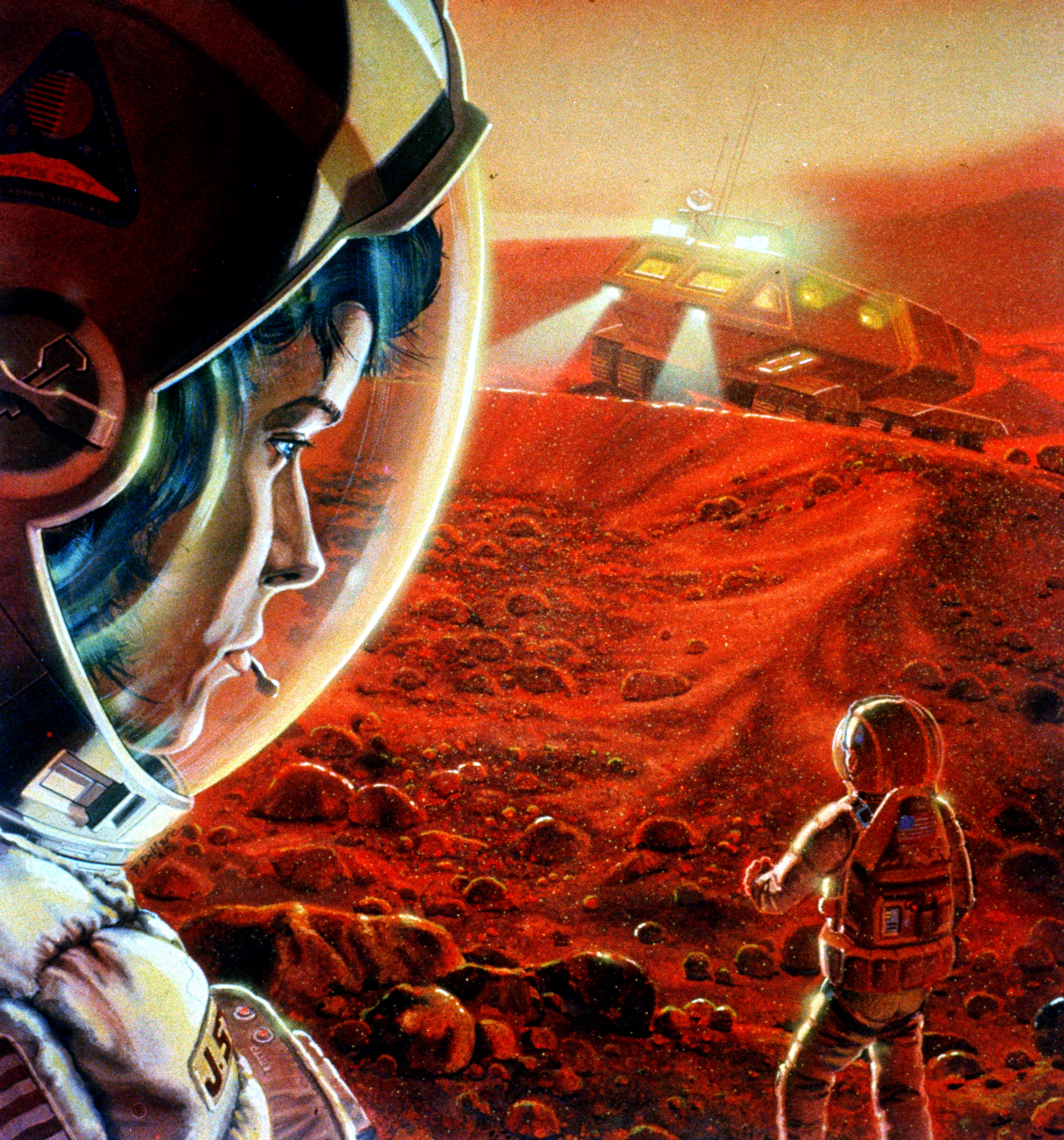
Artist's concept, used by ESA in materials about Aurora, that shows astronauts walking on Mars during a dust storm

The Aurora programme (sometimes called Aurora Exploration Programme, or simply Exploration Programme) was a human spaceflight programme of the European Space Agency (ESA) established in 2001. The objective was to formulate and then to implement a European long-term plan for exploration of the Solar System using robotic spacecraft and human spaceflight to investigate bodies holding promise for traces of life beyond the Earth. The Aurora programme is no longer active. The Terrae Novae programme, established in the 2010s, took over the Aurora's ExoMars programme as well as ESA's long-term deep-space human spaceflight ambitions.

== Overview ==
Member states committed to participation in the Aurora programme for five-year periods, after which they can change their level of participation or pull out entirely. In the early years the Aurora programme planned for flagship missions and arrow missions for key technology demonstrations, such as Earth re-entry vehicle/capsule and Mars aerocapture demonstrator. Although human spaceflight has remained a long-term goal of the programme, with some basic technology development in this area, the thrust has been on implementation of the ExoMars mission and preparations for an international Mars sample return mission.

"The objective of the Aurora Programme is first to formulate and then to implement a European long-term plan for the robotic and human exploration of solar system bodies holding promise for traces of life."

— ESA

The Aurora programme was a response to Europe's Strategy for space which was endorsed by European Union Council of Research and the ESA Council. Europe strategy for space had three main points including: "explore the solar system and the Universe", "stimulate new technology", and "inspire the young people of Europe to take a greater interest in science and technology". One of the foundational principles of the Aurora program was recognising the interdependence of technology and exploration.

== Missions ==
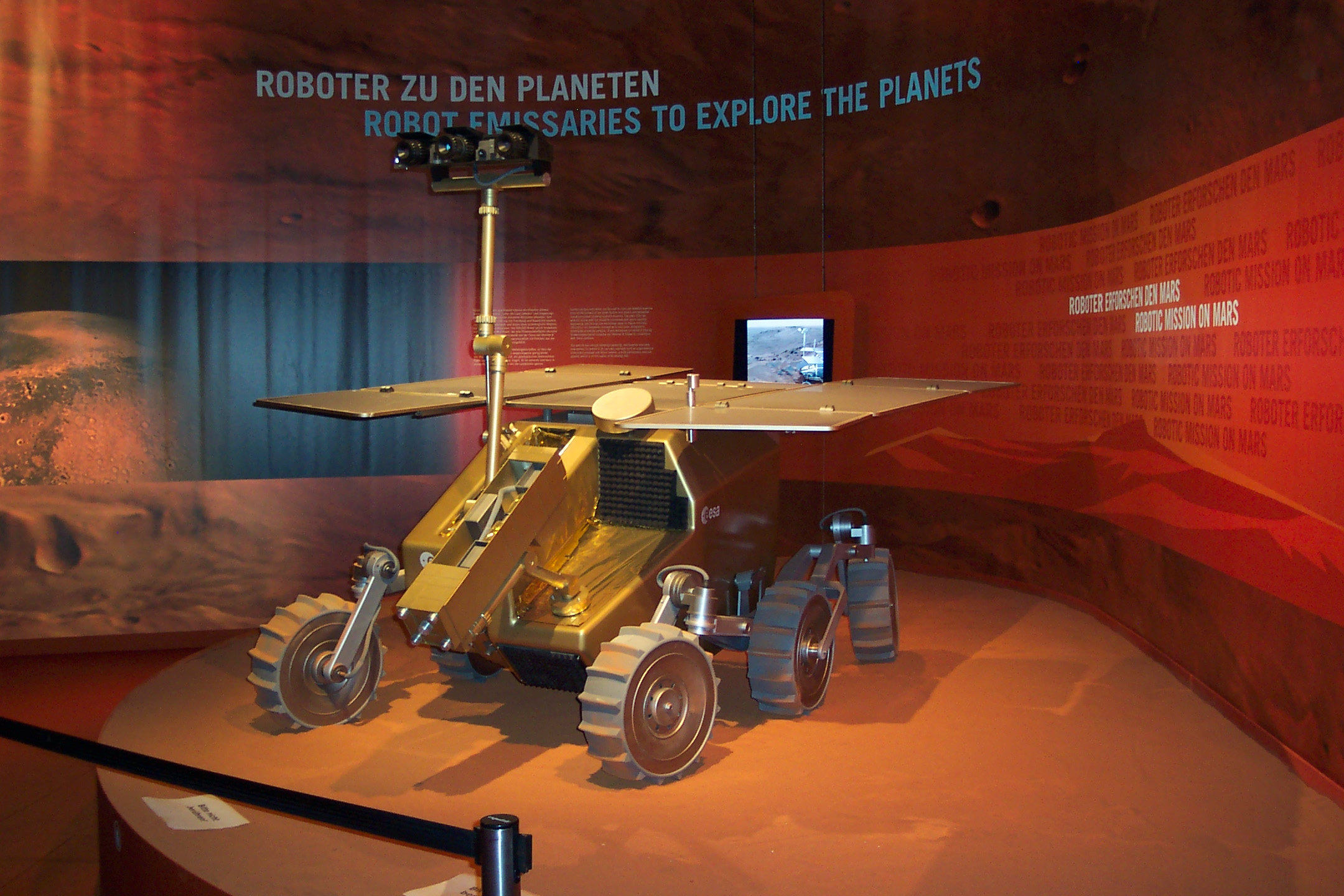
Model of the ExoMars rover in 2006

=== Flagship missions ===
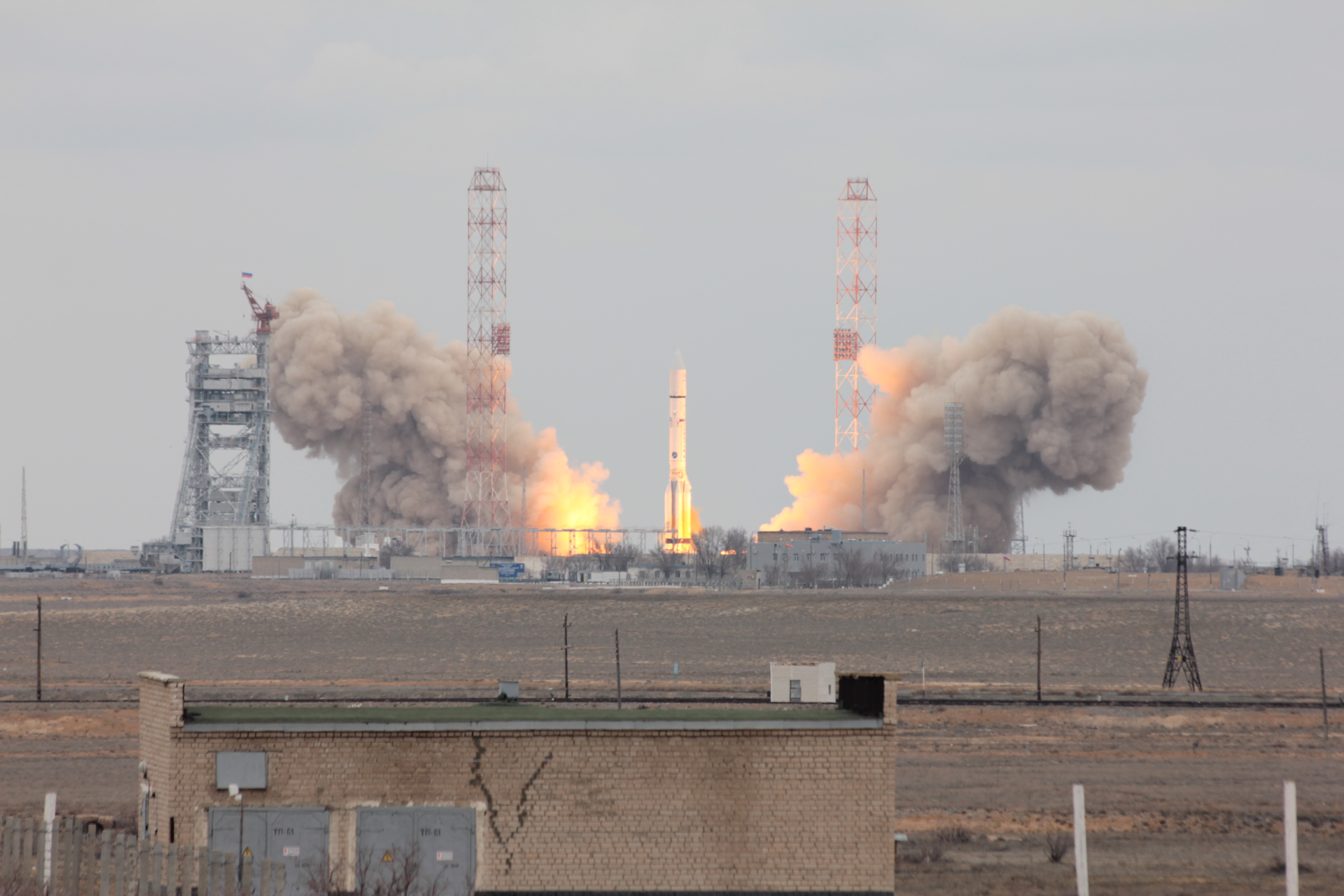
ExoMars TGO launches in 2016

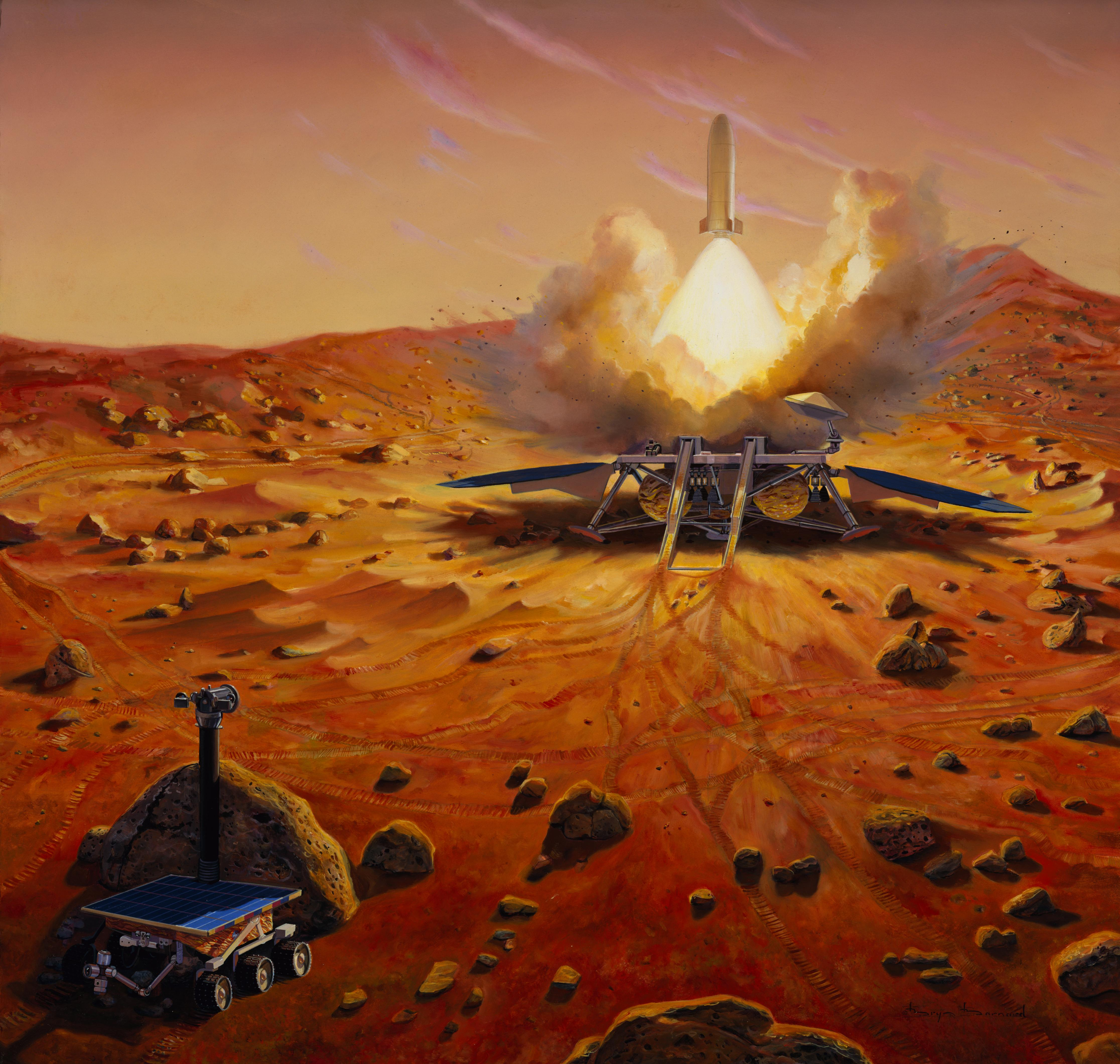
Artist's concept of a Mars sample-return mission

ESA described some Aurora programme missions as Flagship missions. The first Flagship mission was ExoMars, a dual robotic mission to Mars made in cooperation with the Russian Federal Space Agency and its successor Roscosmos. It involved a Mars orbiter (ExoMars Trace Gas Orbiter), a technology demonstrator descent module (Schiaparelli lander), and the Rosalind Franklin rover.

The only mission launched under the Aurora programme was:

- ExoMars Trace Gas Orbiter and Schiaparelli, an uncrewed Mars orbiter and lander launched jointly with the Russian Roscosmos in 2016 on Proton rocket with Fregat upper stage.

Flagship missions considered for the Aurora programme included:

- Rosalind Franklin rover originally intended to be conducted jointly with Roscosmos. Cooperation with Russia was cancelled in 2022 after the Russian invasion of Ukraine. As of 2025, the launch is scheduled for 2028 under the Terrae Novae programme.
- a robotic Mars Sample Return Mission by the mid-2020s
- a human space mission to be launched in the mid-2030s

=== Arrow missions ===
Arrow missions were proposed technology demonstrator missions focused on developing a certain technology needed for the Flagship missions. No Arrow mision was launched. Approved Arrow missions, as of 30 January 2003 were:

- Earth re-entry vehicle/capsule, a step in the preparations for the Mars Sample Return mission
- Mars aerocapture demonstrator, to further develop the technologies for using a planet's atmosphere to brake into orbit. This particular mission seems to have been revised into an expanded mission to demonstrate "aerobraking/aerocapture, solar electric propulsion and soft landing" to be launched in 2020

=== Proposed timeline ===
As of September 2005, the proposed Aurora roadmap was:

- 2014 – Human mission technologies demonstrator(s) to validate technologies for orbital assembly and docking, life support and human habitation
- 2016 and 2020 – ExoMars rover for exobiological studies as well as study of the surface of Mars
- 2026 – Robotic mission to Mars
- 2030s – First human mission to Mars, as a split mission.

== See also ==
- Astrobiology
- Constellation program
- Space exploration
- Human spaceflight
- Mars sample return mission
