= Philip Butler (disambiguation) =

Philip Butler was a politician.

Philip Butler may also refer to:

- Philip Butler (rugby league)
- Phillip N. Butler - American navy officer
- Phil Butler (physicist) - New Zealand physicist
