= Phil Butler (physicist) =

New Zealand physicist

Phil Butler CNZM
- Born: Philip Howard Butler
- Alma mater: University of Canterbury
- Known for: Co-inventor of the MARS spectral CT scanner; point group symmetry methods
- Awards: KiwiNet Researcher Entrepreneur Award (2015); UC Innovation Medal (2018); CNZM (2022)
- Scientific career
- Fields: Physics, medical physics, group theory, particle physics
- Workplaces: University of Canterbury
- Thesis: (1970)

Philip Howard Butler CNZM is a New Zealand physicist and professor at the University of Canterbury. His early research applied group theory to atomic, molecular and solid-state physics. He later worked on laser treatment of vascular birthmarks, led the New Zealand team in the Compact Muon Solenoid experiment at CERN, and with his son Anthony Butler, a radiologist and professor at the University of Otago, invented the MARS spectral (colour) CT scanner, commercialised by the spin-out company MARS Bioimaging.

== Education ==
Butler studied physics at the University of Canterbury, graduating BSc (Hons) in the late 1960s and completing a PhD in physics in 1970.

== Academic career ==
Butler spent most of his career in the university's physics department. He was head of the Physics and Astronomy Department in 1997–98 and 2002–06, and Pro-Vice-Chancellor (Resources) from 1998 and Pro-Vice-Chancellor (Services) until 2001. He retired in late 2021.

Butler was one of the academics who persuaded the university to establish Canterprise, its commercialisation office.

== Research ==
=== Group theory and symmetry ===
Much of Butler's early work, often with Brian Wybourne, concerned the calculation of coupling coefficients and related quantities for point groups and other groups, for use in atomic spectroscopy and condensed-matter physics. His 1975 paper on coupling coefficients and tensor operators appeared in the Philosophical Transactions of the Royal Society. His 1981 book Point Group Symmetry Applications: Methods and Tables (Plenum Press) was reviewed in Acta Crystallographica and in Crystal Research and Technology.

=== Medical physics and lasers ===
From the late 1980s Butler worked with the plastic surgeon E. Peter Walker on treating port-wine stains with a copper vapour laser, together with students including J. W. Pickering and D. J. Smithies. Their work included a computerised scanning system for delivering the treatment, and their 1990 paper in the British Journal of Plastic Surgery was cited by later studies of port-wine stain treatment. Butler co-founded Medical Laser Developments Ltd.

=== CERN and the CMS experiment ===
Butler led the New Zealand team in the Compact Muon Solenoid (CMS) experiment at CERN. As a member of the CMS collaboration he is one of many authors of its collective publications.

=== MARS spectral CT ===
Butler and his son Anthony invented the MARS spectral X-ray scanner, which adapts photon-counting detector technology developed at CERN to produce three-dimensional colour images. In July 2018 the first human was scanned with it; Butler himself was the first person scanned, with his wrist and ankle imaged. The scanner is commercialised by MARS Bioimaging, and Butler has been its chief executive and a director.

=== Citation record ===
As of November 2026, Google Scholar listed about 300,000 citations to Butler's work and an h-index of 239. Most of these citations come from the large CMS collaboration papers on which he is one of many authors; his sole-authored and small-team work in group theory, laser medicine and spectral CT is cited far less often.

== Science education and community work ==
Butler was a driving force behind the establishment of the National Science-Technology Roadshow Trust, which has toured exhibitions to schools around New Zealand since 1988, and is a trustee of the Christchurch science centre Science Alive.

== Honours and awards ==
- 2015 – KiwiNet Researcher Entrepreneur Award
- 2018 – University of Canterbury Innovation Medal
- 2022 – Companion of the New Zealand Order of Merit, for services to science, education and health

== Selected publications ==
- Butler, P. H. (1981). Point Group Symmetry Applications: Methods and Tables. New York: Plenum Press. ISBN 0-306-40523-7.
- Butler, P. H. (1975). "Coupling coefficients and tensor operators for chains of groups". Philosophical Transactions of the Royal Society of London A. 277: 545–585.
- Butler, P. H.; Wybourne, B. G. (1976). "Calculation of j and jm symbols for arbitrary compact groups I. Methodology". International Journal of Quantum Chemistry. 10: 581–598.
- Pickering, J. W.; Walker, E. P.; Butler, P. H.; van Halewyn, C. N. (1990). "Copper vapour laser treatment of port-wine stains and other vascular malformations". British Journal of Plastic Surgery. 43: 273–282.
