= Medipix =

Family of pixel detectors

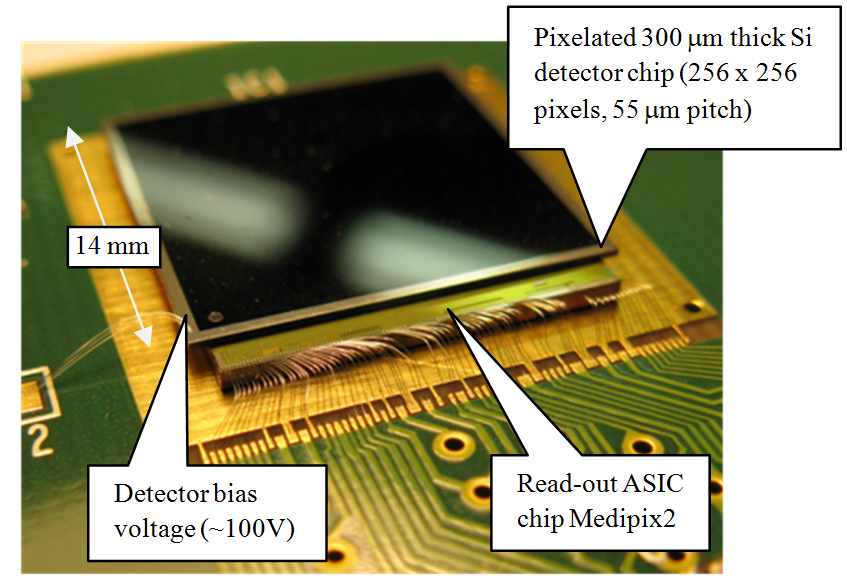
Single Medipix 2 assembly mounted and wire-bonded on a carrier board.

Medipix is a family of photon counting and particle tracking pixel detectors developed by an international collaboration, hosted by CERN.

== Design ==
Principle of photon counting in a single pixel. The radiation generates electron-hole pairs (charge) in the sensor. The charge is collected to the appropriate pixel, amplified and compared with a pre-set comparator level (energy threshold). The counter is increased if the detected pulse is above the energy level.

These are hybrid detectors as a semiconductor sensor layer is bonded to a processing electronics layer.

The sensor layer is a semiconductor, such as silicon, GaAs, or CdTe in which the incident radiation makes an electron hole/cloud. The charge is then collected to pixel electrodes and, via bump bonds, conducted to the CMOS electronics layer.

The pixel electronics first amplifies the signal and then compares the signal amplitude with a pre-set discrimination level (an energy threshold). The subsequent signal processing depends on the type of device. A standard Medipix detector increases the counter in the appropriate pixel if the signal is above the discrimination level. The Medipix device also contains an upper discrimination level and hence only signals within a range of amplitude could be accepted (within an energy window).

Timepix devices offer two more modes of operation in addition to the counting. The first one is so called “Time-over-Threshold” mode (Wilkinson type analog-to-digital converter). It is a mode where the counter in each pixel records the number of clocks for which the pulse remains above the discrimination level. This number is proportional to the energy of detected radiation. This mode is useful for particle tracking applications or for direct spectral imaging.

The second mode of the Timepix chip is “Time-of-arrival”, in which pixel counters record time between a trigger and detection of radiation quanta with energy above the discrimination level. This mode of operation finds use in time of flight (ToF) applications, for instance in neutron imaging.

Every individual hit of radiation is processed by the electronics integrated in each pixel this way, therefore the device could be considered as 65 536 individual counting detectors or even spectrometers. The energy discriminators are adjustable. Therefore, scanning with their level it is possible to measure over frequency-bands of the incoming radiation; thus enabling spectroscopic x-ray imaging.

Medipix-2, Timepix, and Medipix-3 are all 256×256 pixels, each 0.055 mm (55 μm) square, forming a total area 14.08 mm × 14.08 mm. Larger area detectors can be created by bump-bonding many chips to larger monolithic sensors. Detectors of sizes from 2x2 to 2x4 chips are commonly used. Even larger, gapless areas could be created using the edgeless sensor technology. Medipix/Timepix chips each have its own sensor. These assemblies are tiled next to each other to create nearly arbitrarily sized detector arrays (the largest build using this technology has 10x10 chips, hence 14x14 cm and 2560x2560 pixels).

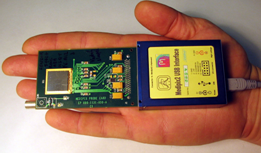
Standard, single chip Medipix carrier board with USB readout.

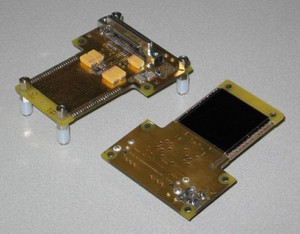
The quad board: four Medipix2 chips with one common sensor chip to have a larger area with limited dead space.

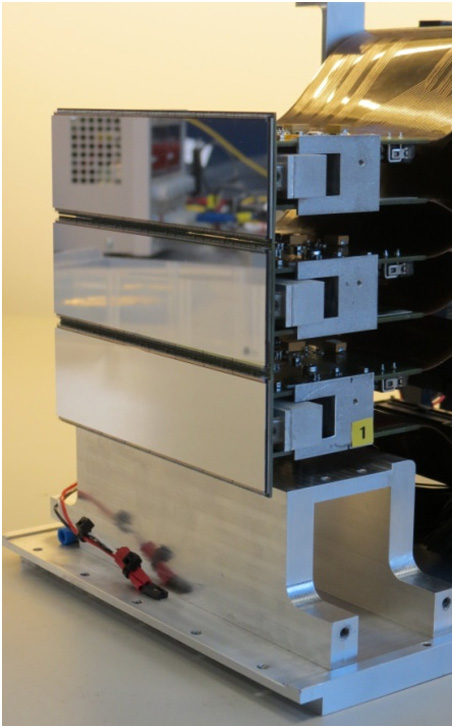
Excalibur front end. Each of the three sensors has 16 chips flip chip bonded.

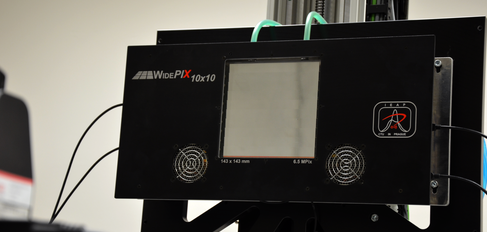
WidePix 10x10 with resolution of 2560x2560 pixels (6.5 Mpixels) and continuously sensitive area.

== Comparison with existing technologies ==
Photon counting pixel detectors represent the next generation of radiation imaging detectors. The photon counting technology overcomes limitations of current imaging devices. Comparison of photon counting with existing technologies is in the following table:

	Film emulsions	Charge integrating devices	Photon counting pixel detectors
Operation principle	Change of chemical or physical properties after interaction with radiation. Needs special treatment (developing process, scanning, ...).	Ionizing radiation creates light and subsequently an electric charge that is collected and integrated in pixels (CCD, CMOS sensors, Flat panels, ...).	Ionizing radiation creates charge directly in the sensor. The charge is compared with threshold and counted digitally in pixels.
Advantages	Very high resolution, low noise, cheap.	High spatial resolution. Low price.	Good spatial resolution, high read-out speed, no noise, no dark current, unlimited dynamic scale, energy discrimination
Disadvantages	Nonlinear response, limited dynamic scale, needs processing	Dark current, noise, limited dynamic scale	High price.

== Versions ==
Medipix-1 was the first device of the Medipix family. It had 64x64 pixels of 170 μm pitch. Pixels contained one comparator (threshold) with 3-bit per-pixel offset adjustment. The minimum threshold was ~5.5 keV. The counter depth was 15-bit. The maximum count rate per pixel was 2 MHz per pixel.

Medipix-2 is the successor of Medipix-1. The pixel pitch was reduced to 55 μm and the pixel array is of 256x256 pixels. Each pixel has two discrimination levels (upper and lower threshold) each adjustable individually in pixels using a 3-bit offset. The maximum count rate is about 100 kHz per pixel (however in pixels with 9x smaller area compared to Medipix-1).

Medipix-2 MXR is an improved version of Medipix-2 device with better temperature stability, pixel counter overflow protection, increased radiation hardness and many other improvements.

Timepix is device conceptually originating from Medipix-2. It adds two more modes to the pixels, in addition to counting of detected signals: Time-over-Threshold (TOT) and Time-of-Arrival (TOA). The detected pulse height is recorded in the pixel counter in the TOT mode. The TOA mode measures time between trigger and arrival of the radiation into each pixel.

Medipix-3 is the latest generation of photon counting devices for X-ray imaging. The pixel pitch remains the same (55 μm) as well as the pixel array size (256x256). It has better energy resolution through real time correction of charge sharing. It also has multiple counters per pixel that can be used in several different modes. This allows for continuous readout and up to eight energy thresholds.

Timepix-3 is a successor of the Timepix chip. One of the biggest distinguishing changes is the approach to the data readout. All previous chips used the frame-based readout, i.e. the whole pixel matrix was read out at once. Timepix-3 has event-based readout where values recorded in pixels are read out immediately after the hit together with coordinates of the hit pixel. The chip therefore generates a continuous stream of data rather than a sequence of frames. The next major difference compared to the previous Timepix chip is the ability to measure the hit amplitude simultaneously with the time of arrival. Other parameters such as energy and timing resolution were also improved compared to the original Timepix chip.

Timepix-4 is the successor of the Timepix-3 chip. It has general stronger specifications for instance its time-of-arrival resolution is 195 ps, 8 times faster than Timepix-3, it also has a larger pixelmatrix of 512x448 pixels and can handle 8 times higher data rates.

== Readout electronics ==
The digital data recorded by Medipix/Timepix devices are transferred to a computer via readout electronics. The readout electronics is also responsible for setup and control of the detector parameters. Several readout systems were developed within the Medipix collaboration

=== Muros ===
Muros was one of the first readout systems of Medipix detectors. Muros was developed at Nikhef, Amsterdam, The Netherlands. It was relatively compact readout enabling access to all features of the detector. It allowed maximum frame rate of cca 30 frames/s with a single chip.

=== USB interface ===
This electronics was developed at IEAP-CTU, Czech Republic. It provides a lower frame rate compared to Muros, but the electronics was integrated into a box not larger than a pack of cigarettes. Moreover, no special PC hardware card was needed as it was in case of Muros. Therefore, the USB interface become quickly the most used readout within the Medipix collaboration and its partners.

=== Relaxd ===
Relaxd is a readout electronics developed at Nikhef. The data is transferred to PC via 1 Gbit/s Ethernet connection. The maximum frame rate is at level of 100 frame/s.

=== Fitpix ===
Fitpix is the next generation of the USB interface developed by the group in Prague. The electronics implements the parallel Medipix/Timepix readout and therefore the maximum frame rate reaches 850 frame/s. It supports also the serial readout with frame rate of 100 frames/s.

=== Minipix ===
Minipix is a miniaturized integrated chip+readout electronics device developed by ADVACAM s.r.o. in Prague. The whole system has size of a USB flash drive. Several of these devices were used on the International Space Station as radiation monitoring systems.

=== Spidr3 ===
Spidr3 is powerful readout electronics for the TimePix3 and MediPix3 chip. The readout rate for the MediPix3 is about 12500 frames per second and for the TimePix3 of 120 Million Hits per second. The data are transferred by a powerful 10 GB optical fiber connection. The chip and readout system is developed together with Nikhef and Amsterdam Scientific Instruments.

=== Excalibur and Merlin systems ===
Both systems are developed at Diamond Light Source, UK, for Medipix3 readout and applications at synchrotrons. Merlin is available with CdTe sensors from Quantum Detectors who are collaborating on further development with Diamond Light Source.

=== LAMBDA system ===
Lambda is a high-speed (2,000 fps) big area (12 chips) readout systems developed at DESY. Lambda is available with high-Z sensor options, such as GaAs (Gallium-Arsenide) and CdTe (Cadmium-Telluride).

=== MARS ===
MARS is a gigabit Ethernet readout accommodating up to 6 Medipix 2 or Medipix 3 detectors. The electronics was developed at University of Otago, Christchurch, New Zealand.

== Applications ==
=== X-ray imaging ===
X-ray imaging is the primary application field of Medipix detectors. Medipix offers to the X-ray imaging field in particular an advantage in higher dynamic range and energy sensitivity. Examples of X-ray images from selected X-ray imaging application fields are:

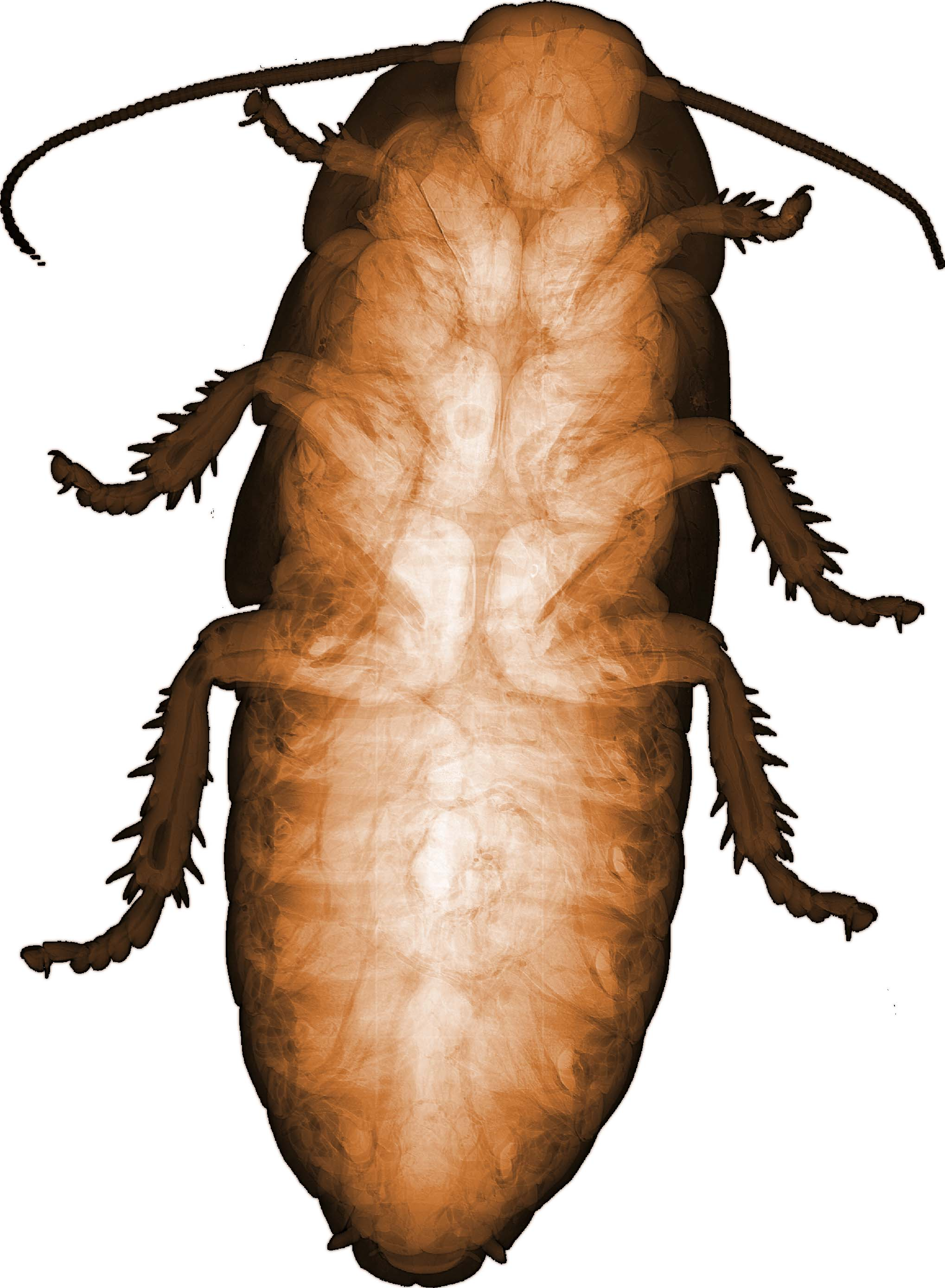
Biology: Tropical cockroach.

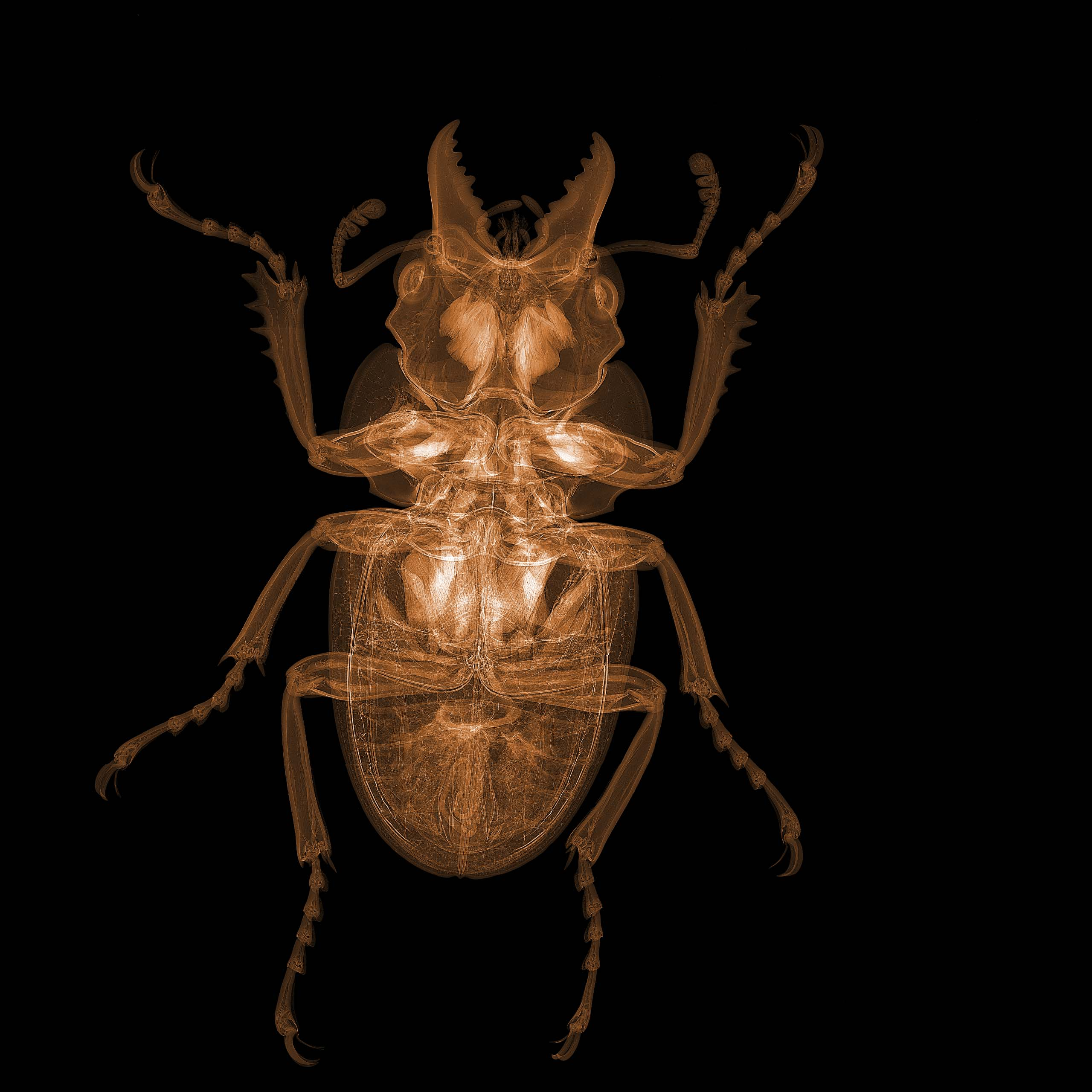
Biology: Ground beetle.

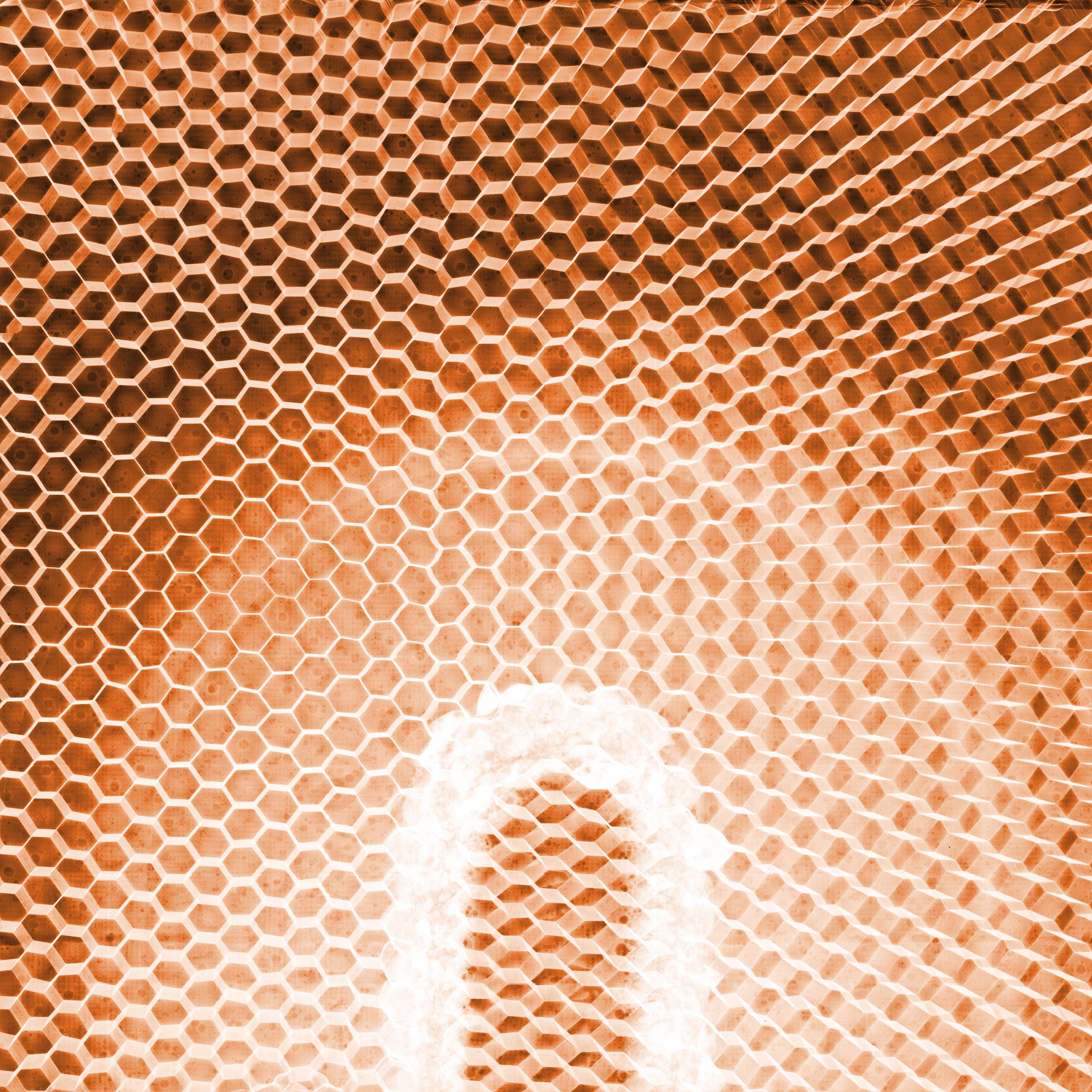
Non-destructive testing: Metallic composite sample.

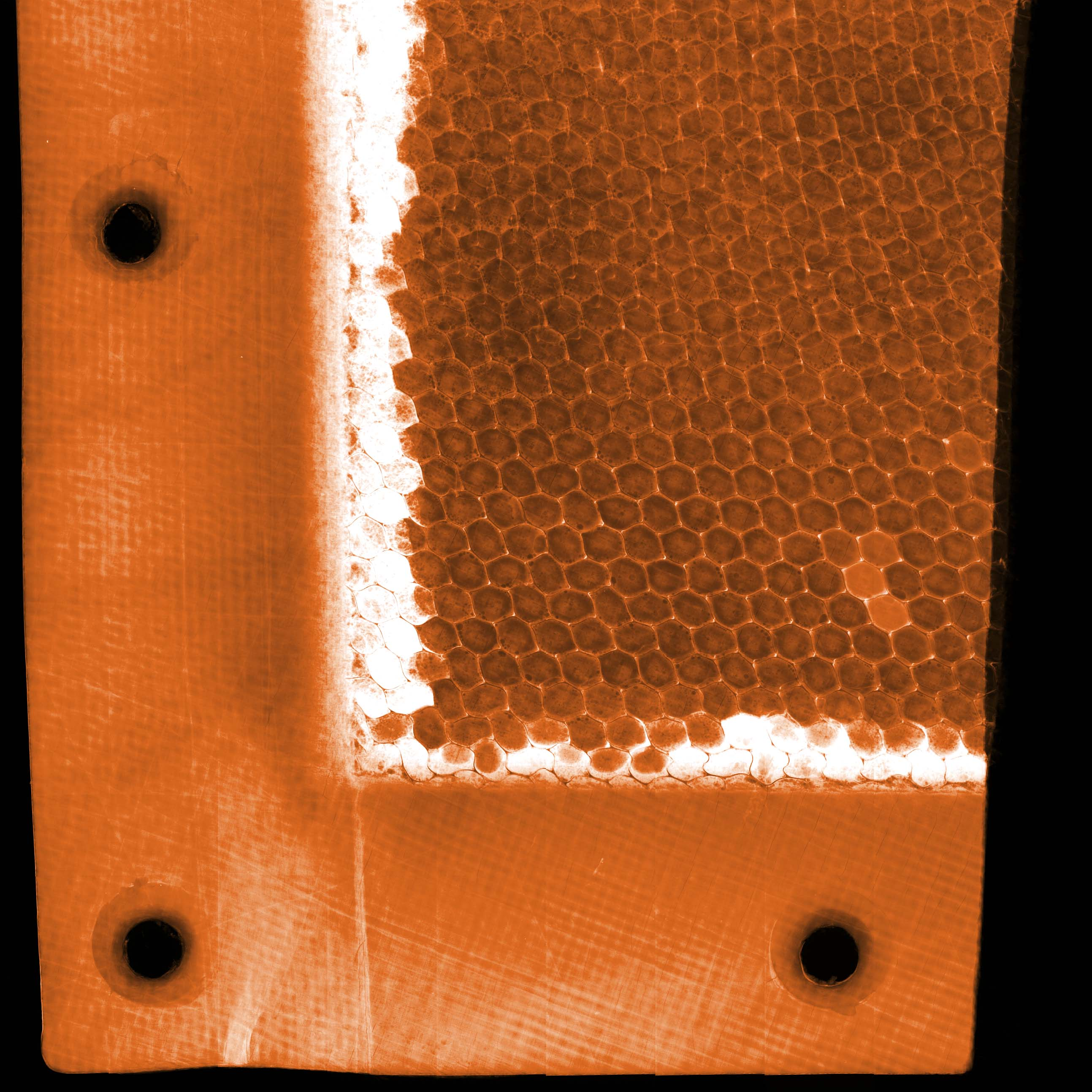
Non-destructive testing: Paper core composite sample.

=== Space radiation dosimetry ===
Timepix-based detectors from the Medipix2 Collaboration have been flown on the International Space Station since 2013, and on the first flight test (EFT-1) of NASA's new Orion Multi-Purpose Crew Vehicle in December 2014. Current plans call for similar devices to be flown as the primary radiation area monitors on the future initial crewed Orion missions.

=== Other ===
The detectors may also find applications in astronomy, high energy physics, medical imaging, and X-ray spectroscopy.

== History ==
- Medipix-1: Early 90s.
- Medipix-2: Late 90s.
- Medipix-3: Collaboration formed 2006.
- Medipix-4: Collaboration formed 2016.

== See also ==
- MARS Bioimaging
