= Advacam =

ADVACAM s.r.o.
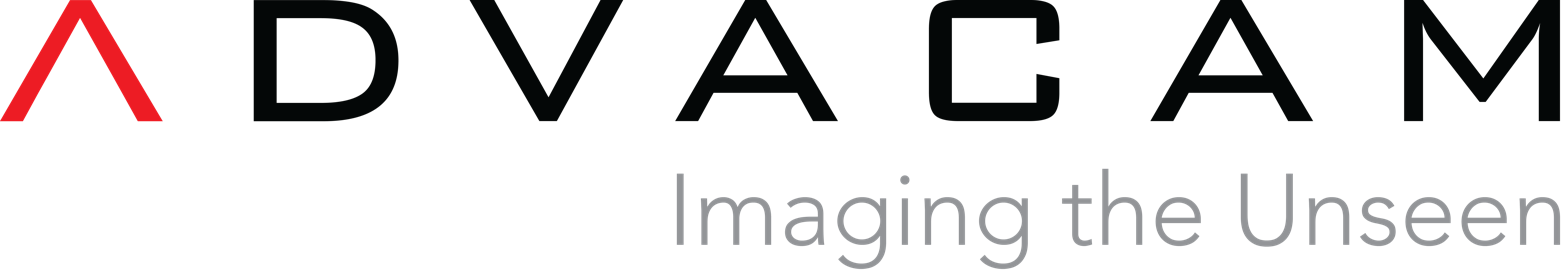
- Type: Limited liability company (s.r.o.)
- Industry: Imaging technologies, particle physics, space industry
- Founded: May 29, 2013; 13 years ago
- Founders: Jan Sohar, Jan Jakůbek
- Headquarters: U Pergamenky 1145/12, Holešovice, 170 00 Prague 7, Prague, Czech Republic
- Key people: Jan Sohar (Managing Director); Jan Jakůbek (Managing Director); Josef Uher (Chairman of the Supervisory Board); Tomáš Bobela (Member of the Supervisory Board)
- Products: Spectral X-ray cameras, pixel radiation detectors (MiniPIX, AdvaPIX, WidePIX)
- Website: advacam.com

ADVACAM s.r.o. is a Czech high-tech company headquartered in Prague, which develops and manufactures cameras for spectral X-ray imaging and semiconductor pixel detectors for tracking individual particles. At the end of 2025, it became part of the Czech technology group AdVisiones Technologies. Its detectors find applications in space dosimetry, material analysis, electron microscopy, non-destructive testing (NDT), art examination, and biomedicine.

== History ==
The company was established on 29 May 2013 as a spin-off of the Institute of Technical and Experimental Physics of the Czech Technical University in Prague (ITEP CTU) in close collaboration with the international Medipix Collaboration at the European Organization for Nuclear Research (CERN). The founders of the company are Jan Sohar and physicist Jan Jakůbek. Its statutory body consists of managing directors Jan Sohar and Jan Jakůbek; in June 2026, a supervisory board was established comprising Josef Uher (Chairman) and Tomáš Bobela.

== Technology ==
ADVACAM builds upon research in the field of high-energy physics initiated in the 1990s at CERN. The Medipix and Timepix families of photon-counting chips were originally developed for the ATLAS experiment at the Large Hadron Collider (LHC).

Each pixel in these detectors (typically with a 55-micrometer pitch) independently registers and counts every single photon or charged particle striking the sensor surface while simultaneously measuring its energy and time of arrival (at up to 3,000 frames per second). This technology completely eliminates electronic noise and enables high-contrast spectral ("color") X-ray imaging capable of distinguishing the material composition of the examined object. Well-known product lines include the miniaturized MiniPIX detectors (the size of a USB flash drive) and large-area WidePIX detectors.

== Applications ==
Photon-counting technology can be utilized across many areas of commercial manufacturing and science. ADVACAM detectors are used in:

- Space weather monitoring and forecasting: ADVACAM detectors operate aboard the International Space Station (ISS), on satellites (such as VZLUSAT and OneWeb), and six Timepix chips form a key component of the HERA radiation monitoring system aboard the Orion spacecraft within the NASA Artemis program, including the crewed Artemis II mission.
- Material analysis and non-destructive testing (NDT): The cameras reveal microscopic defects in joints, composites, alloys, polymers, and electronics.
- Radiation detection: Combined with drones or mobile robots, the cameras allow real-time localization and identification of ionizing radiation sources.
- Biomedicine and education: Particle detection is used in cancer research and targeted tumor irradiation (the Beam TraX system tested at the German Cancer Research Center in Heidelberg) as well as in educational kits for teaching physics in schools.

The company's clients include NASA, the European Space Agency (ESA), CERN, Boeing, SpaceX, and Blue Origin.

== Integration into AdVisiones Technologies and sister companies ==
At the end of 2025, ADVACAM became part of the overarching technology group AdVisiones Technologies a.s. (described as a technology hub for imaging innovation), founded by Jan Sohar, Jan Jakůbek, and Josef Uher. The group consolidated ADVACAM alongside other specialized subsidiary and sister companies that develop specific industrial, scientific, and medical applications:

- AdvaSpace s.r.o. – a subsidiary established at the end of 2025 focusing on space radiation detectors and building a satellite service for monitoring and forecasting space weather.
- Radalytica a.s. – develops mobile robotic imaging systems combining 3D CT and ultrasound for non-destructive testing (NDT).
- AdvaScope s.r.o. – a subsidiary specializing in hybrid pixel detectors for electron microscopes.
- InsightART s.r.o. – provides solutions for spectral X-ray radiography of artworks, conservation, and forgery detection.
- re-medical s.r.o. – develops detection and robotic solutions for radiotherapy, nuclear medicine, and human soft-tissue imaging.
- X-ray Imaging Europe GmbH – a German manufacturer of high-efficiency sensor layers for particle detectors based in Freiburg im Breisgau, acquired by the AdVisiones Technologies group at the end of 2025.

== See also ==
- AdVisiones Technologies
- Artemis II
- Medipix
