= MARS Bioimaging =

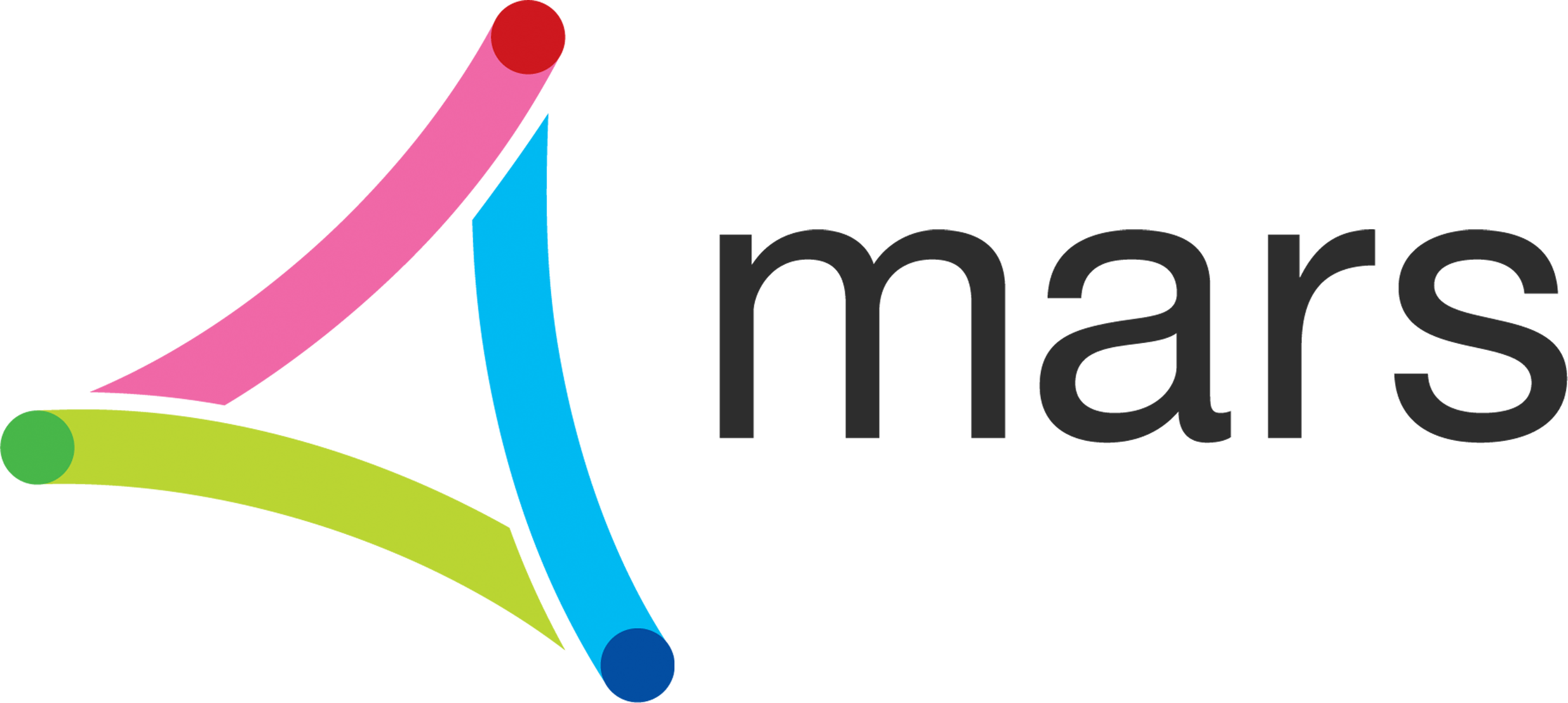
- Industry: Health care Radiology; Manufacturing
- Founded: September 2007
- Founder: Philip Butler, Anthony Butler
- Headquarters: Christchurch, New Zealand, New Zealand
- Area served: Worldwide
- Key people: Philip Butler, CEO
- Products: CT, spectral photon-counting CT
- Services: Medical equipment Technology for drug discovery and biopharmaceuticals Solutions for clinicians and health care administrators
- Website: www.marsbioimaging.com

MARS Bioimaging Limited (MBI) is a medical imaging company focusing on spectral photon counting computed tomography for quantitative color imaging. The company was founded in Christchurch, New Zealand to commercialize the MARS imaging system for its applications in medicine.

== History ==
MARS Bioimaging Limited was founded in September 2007 by father and son professors, Phillip and Anthony Butler to develop x-ray imaging that captures and processes information from individual x-ray photons, producing quantitative 3D color imaging at very high resolution (50-200 μm). MARS imaging systems are based on the new generation Medipix chip licensed out of CERN (European Organization for Nuclear Research), Switzerland and technology developed by the University of Canterbury (UC), and other partners.

Funding for research began in 2003, with a NZ$500,000 grant from the New Economy Research Fund. This fund enabled New Zealand universities to join CERN, including .

NZ$1.5 million grant from the Tertiary Education Commission - Infrastructure Development Fund was awarded to MBI after forming in 2007, followed by a NZ$4.5 million manufacturing award from the Foundation for Research Science and Technology to developing a small animal spectral scanner for researchers.

In 2011, MBI released its first small-bore spectral CT scanner for CT researchers and remains the only company in the world with a commercially available preclinical spectral photon-counting CT scanner.

In February 2014, MBI raised more than NZ$500,000 in series A capital financing led by Powerhouse Ventures (PowerHouse). Series B funding in March 2015, again led by PowerHouse Ventures, raised another NZ$500,000.

The Ministry of Business, Innovation and Employment (MBIE) awarded MBI a High Value Manufacturing award, worth NZ$13 million over 2014-2021.

Since October 2015, Callaghan Innovations has supported MBI in employing MARS researchers through a number of Research and Development Career Grants.

In November 2018, the CEO of MBI was the first living human scanned by a MARS system, followed by the first patient scanned early 2020. On November 16, 2020, MBI announced international clinical trials of their compact, point-of-care MARS system for diagnosing hand and wrist injuries would begin early 2021.
