= Exploration of the Moon =

Missions to the Moon

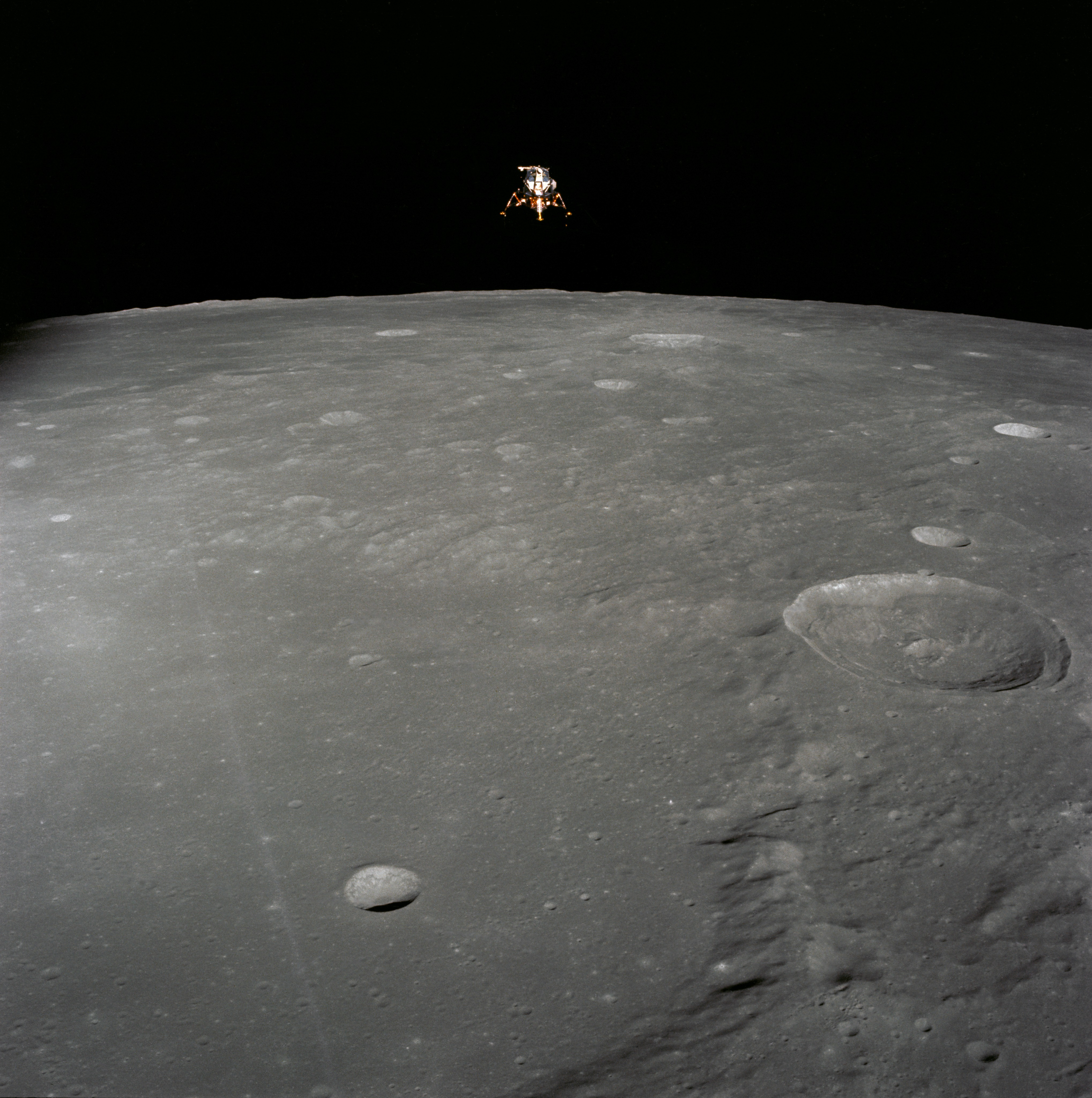
The Apollo 12 Lunar Module Intrepid prepares to descend towards the surface of the Moon. 1969 NASA photo by Richard F. Gordon Jr.

The Lunar Roving Vehicle was driven on the Moon's surface during the 1971 Apollo 15 mission

The physical exploration of the Moon began when Luna 2, a space probe launched by the Soviet Union, made a deliberate impact on the surface of the Moon on 14 September, 1959. Prior to that the only available means of lunar exploration had been observations from Earth. The invention of the optical telescope brought about the first leap in the quality of lunar observations. Galileo Galilei is generally credited as the first person to use a telescope for astronomical purposes, having made his own telescope in 1609. The mountains and craters on the lunar surface were among his first observations.

Human exploration of the Moon since Luna 2 has consisted of both crewed and uncrewed missions. NASA's Apollo program has been the only program to successfully land humans on the Moon, which it did six times on the near side in the late 20th century. The first human landing took place in 1969, when the Apollo 11 astronauts Buzz Aldrin and Neil Armstrong touched down on the surface in the region of Mare Tranquillitatis, leaving scientific instruments upon the mission's completion and returning lunar samples to Earth. All lunar missions had taken place on the lunar near side until the first soft landing on the far side of the Moon was made by the CNSA robotic spacecraft Chang'e 4 in early 2019, which successfully deployed the Yutu-2 robotic lunar rover. On 25 June 2024, CNSA's Chang'e 6 conducted the first lunar sample return from the far side of the Moon.

The goals of lunar exploration across all major space agencies focus on the continued survey of the lunar surface through lunar missions in preparation for the eventual establishment of permanent human outposts.

== Pre-telescopic ==
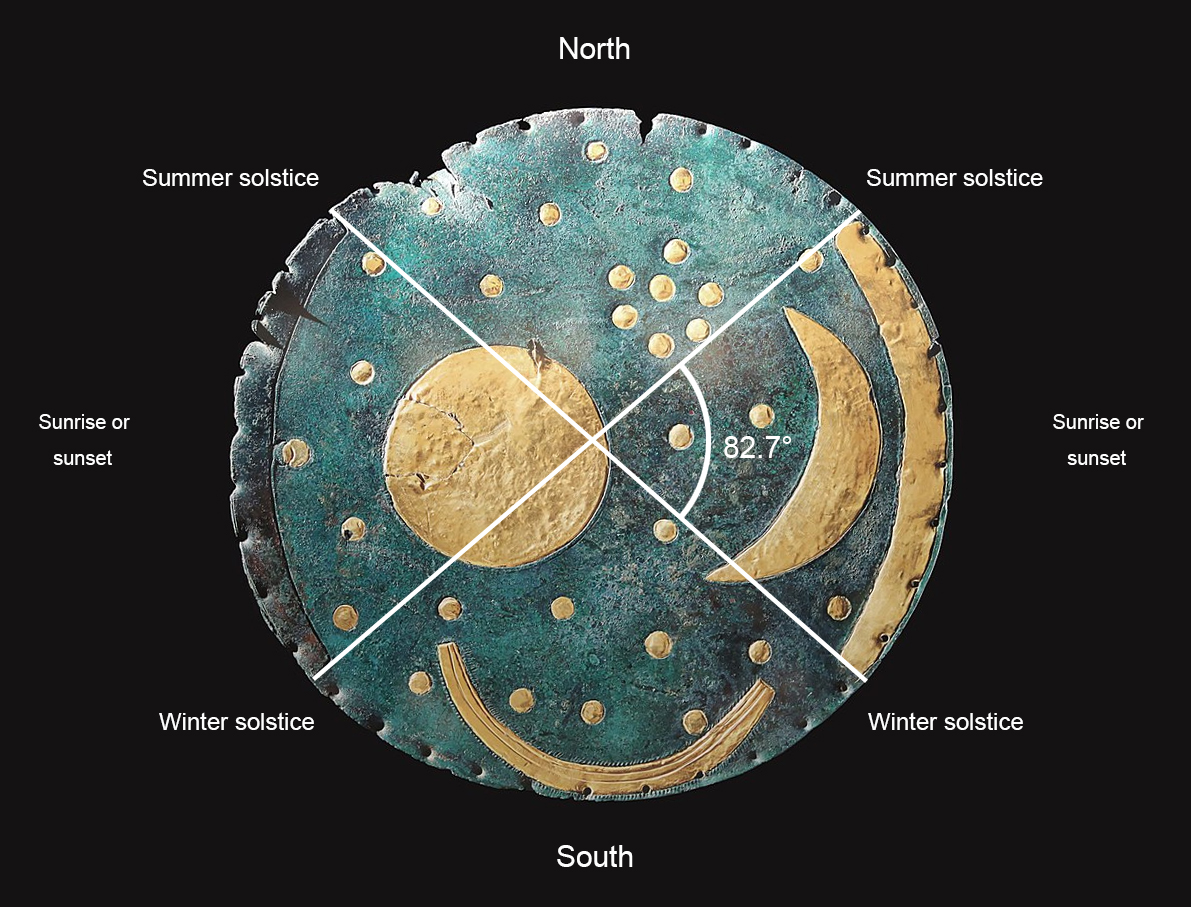
The Nebra sky disc (c. 1800–1600 BCE), found near a possibly astronomical complex, most likely depicting the Sun or full Moon, the Moon as a crescent, the Pleiades and the summer and winter solstices as strips of gold on the side of the disc, with the top representing the horizon and north.

It is believed by some that the oldest cave paintings from up to 40,000 BP of bulls and geometric shapes, or 20–30,000-year-old tally sticks were used to observe the phases of the Moon, keeping time using the waxing and waning of the Moon's phases. Aspects of the Moon were identified and aggregated in lunar deities from prehistoric times and were eventually documented and put into symbols from the very first instances of writing in the 4th millennium BC. One of the earliest known possible depictions of the Moon is a 3,000 BCE rock carving Orthostat 47 at Knowth, Ireland. The crescent depicting the Moon, as with the lunar deity Nanna/Sin, has been found from the 3rd millennium BCE.

The oldest named astronomer and poet, Enheduanna, Akkadian high priestess to the lunar deity Nanna/Sin and princess, daughter of Sargon the Great (c. 2334 – c. 2279 BCE), had the Moon tracked in her chambers. The oldest found and identified depiction of the Moon in an astronomical relation to other astronomical features is the Nebra sky disc from c. 1800–1600 BCE, depicting features like the Pleiades next to the Moon.

The ancient Greek philosopher Anaxagoras, whose non-religious view of the heavens was one cause for his imprisonment and eventual exile, reasoned that the Sun and Moon were both giant spherical rocks and that the latter reflected the light of the former. Plutarch, in his book On the Face in the Moon's Orb, suggested that the Moon had deep recesses in which the light of the Sun did not reach and that the spots are nothing but the shadows of rivers or deep chasms. He also entertained the possibility that the Moon was inhabited. Aristarchus attempted to compute the Moon's size and distance from Earth, although his estimated distance of 20 times Earth's radius (which had been accurately determined by his contemporary Eratosthenes) proved to be about a third the actual average distance.

In Aristotle's (384–322 BC) description of the universe, the Moon marked the boundary between the spheres of the mutable elements (earth, water, air and fire), and the imperishable stars of aether, an influential concept from Aristotelian physics that would dominate for centuries. Archimedes (287–212 BC) designed a planetarium that could calculate the motions of the Moon and other objects in the Solar System. In the 2nd century BC, Seleucus of Seleucia correctly thought that tides were due to the attraction of the Moon, and that their height depends on the Moon's position relative to the Sun. In the same century, Aristarchus computed the size and distance of the Moon from Earth, obtaining a value of about twenty times the radius of Earth for the distance.

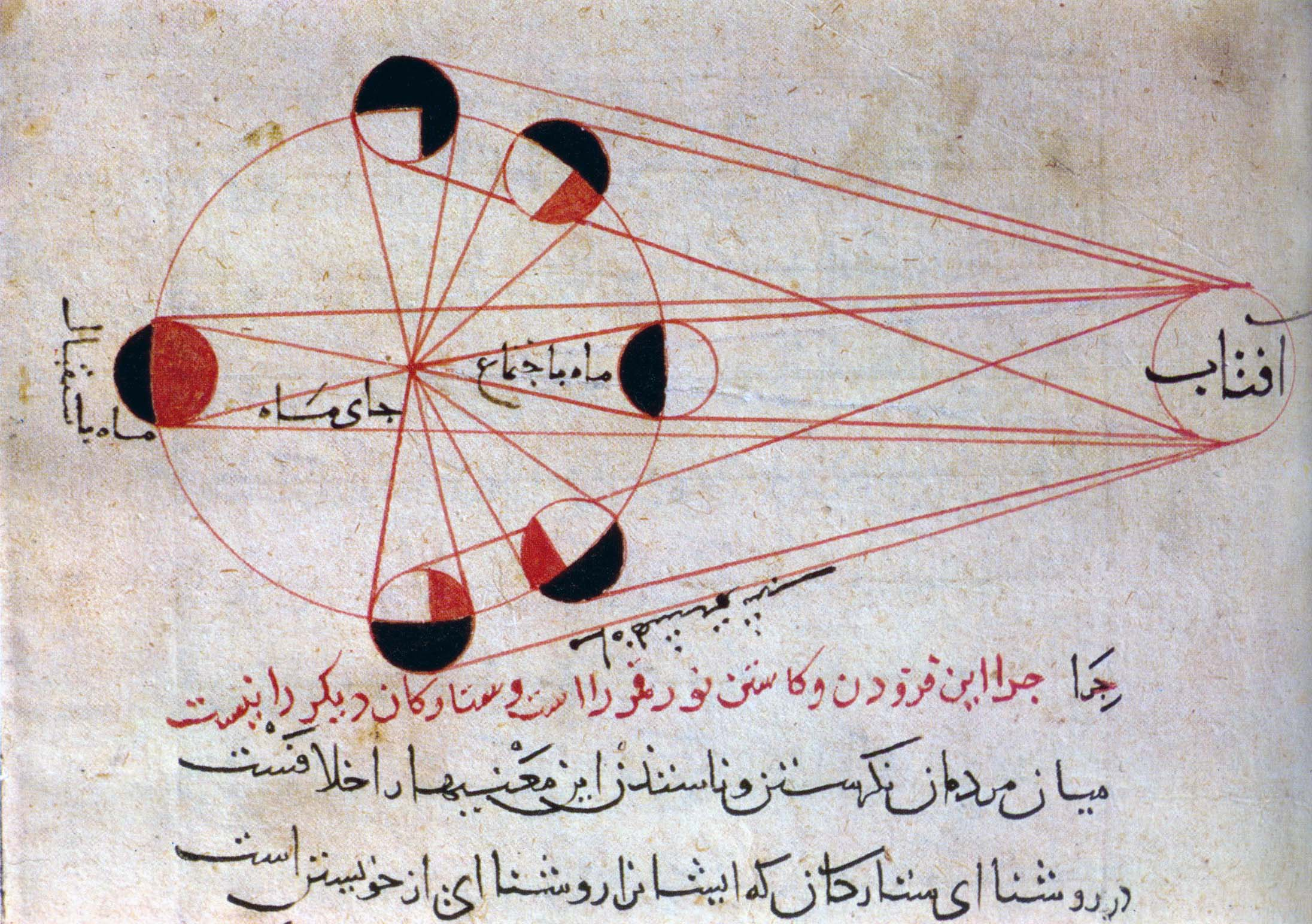
An illustration from al-Biruni's astronomical works that explains the different phases of the Moon, with respect to the position of the Sun.

Chinese philosophers of the Han dynasty believed the Moon to be energy equated to qi but recognized that the light of the Moon was a reflection of the Sun. Mathematician and astrologer Jing Fang noted the sphericity of the Moon. Shen Kuo of the Song dynasty created an allegory equating the waxing and waning of the Moon to a round ball of reflective silver that, when doused with white powder and viewed from the side, would appear to be a crescent.

In the 5th century BC to 4th century BC, Babylonian astronomers had recorded the 18-year Saros cycle of lunar eclipses, Indian astronomer Aryabhata stated in his fifth-century text Aryabhatiya that reflected sunlight is what causes the Moon to shine.

Persian astronomer Habash al-Hasib al-Marwazi conducted various observations at the Al-Shammisiyyah observatory in Baghdad between 825 and 835. Using these observations, he estimated the Moon's diameter as 3,037 km (equivalent to 1,519 km radius) and its distance from the Earth as 346,345 km (215,209 mi). In the 11th century, the Iraqi physicist Alhazen investigated moonlight through a number of experiments and observations, concluding it was a combination of the Moon's own light and the Moon's ability to absorb and emit sunlight.

By the Middle Ages, before the invention of the telescope, an increasing number of people began to recognize the Moon as a sphere, though many believed that it was "perfectly smooth".

== Telescopic exploration before spaceflight ==
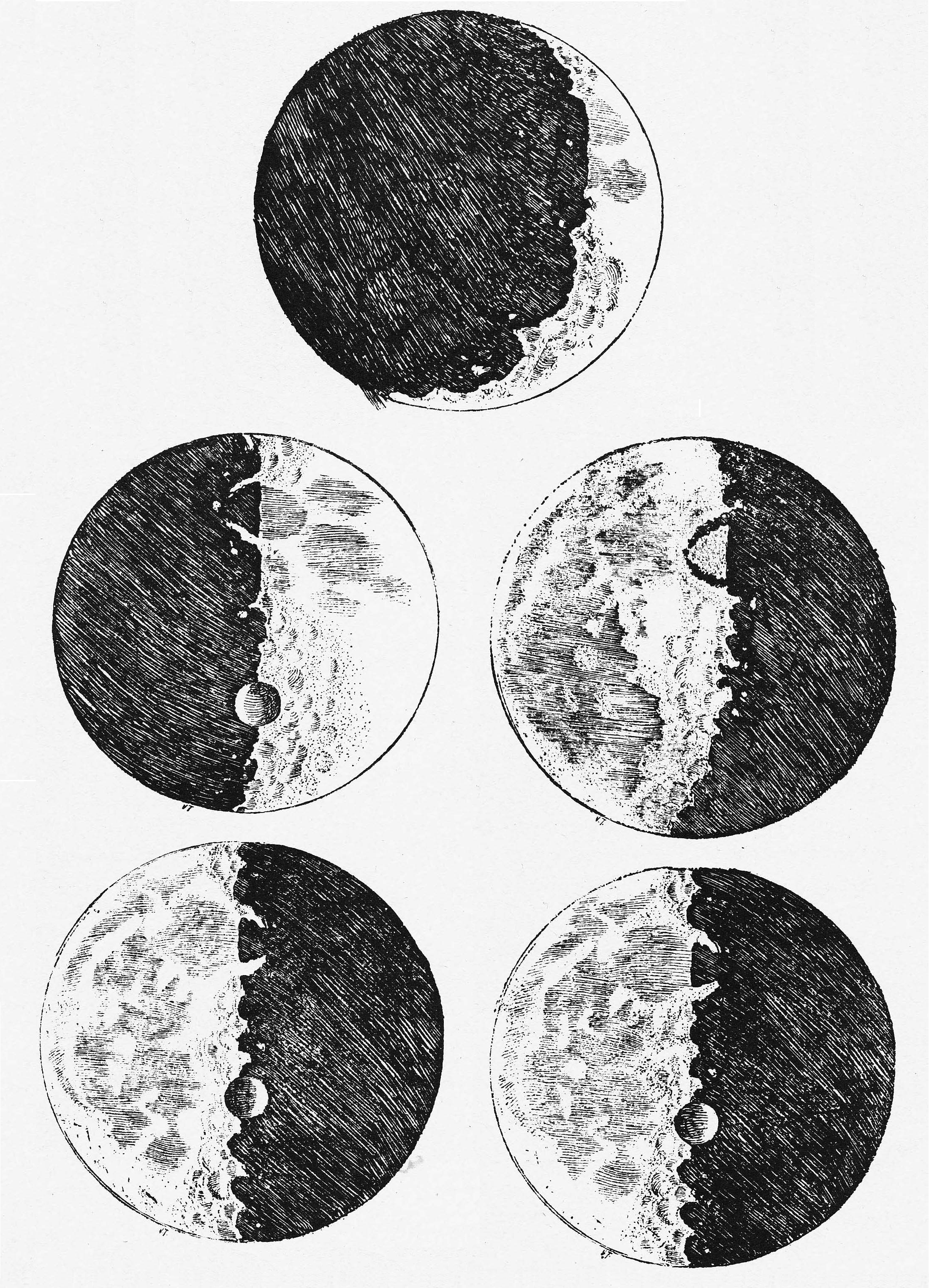
Galileo's sketches of the Moon from the groundbreaking Sidereus Nuncius.

In 1609, Galileo Galilei drew one of the first telescopic drawings of the Moon in his book Sidereus Nuncius and noted that it was not smooth but had mountains and craters. Later in the 17th century, Giovanni Battista Riccioli and Francesco Maria Grimaldi drew a map of the Moon and gave many craters the names they still have. On maps, the dark parts of the Moon's surface were called maria (singular mare) or seas, and the light parts were called terrae or continents.

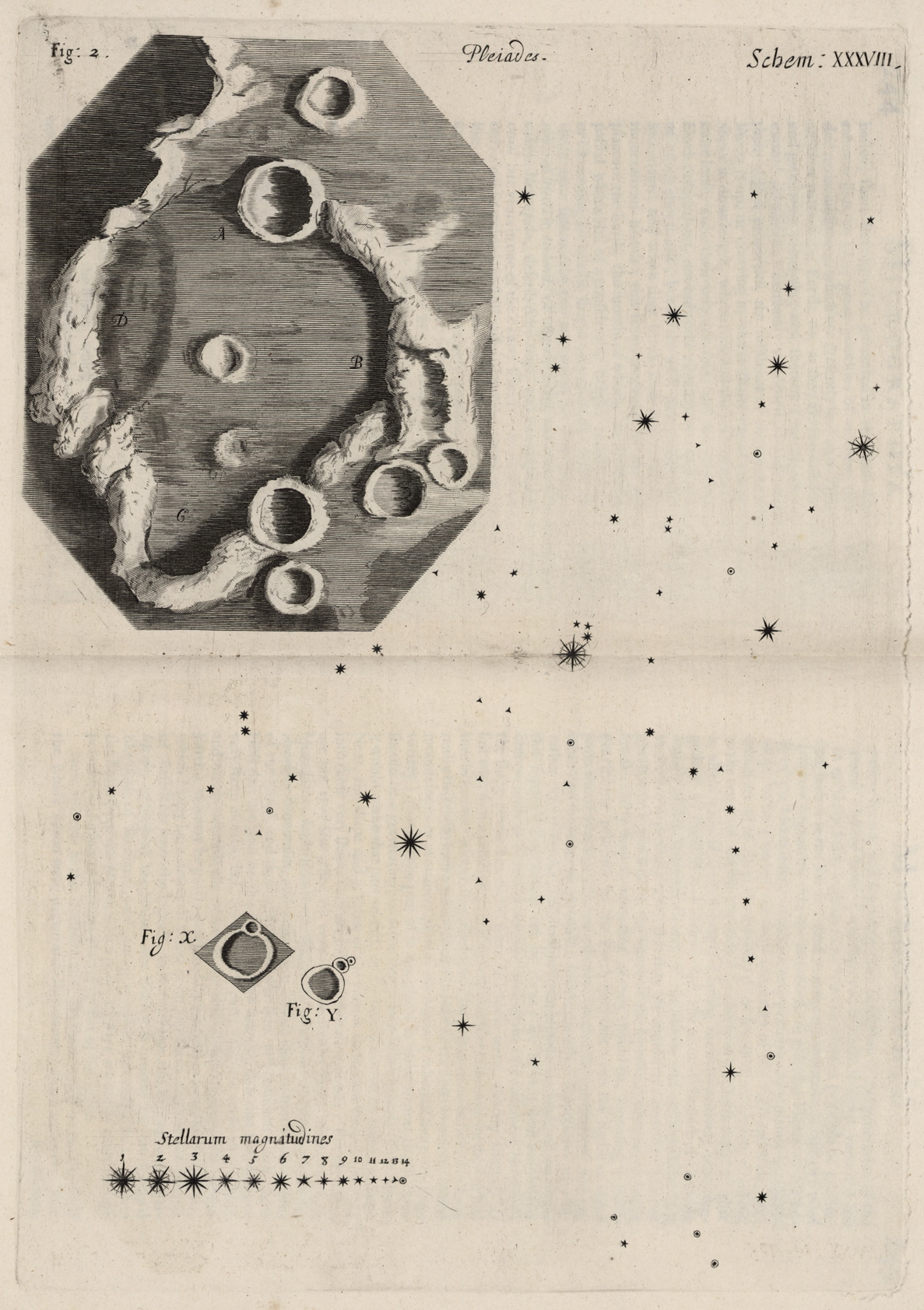
A study of the Moon from Robert Hooke's Micrographia, 1665.

Thomas Harriot, as well as Galileo, drew the first telescopic representation of the Moon and observed it for several years. His drawings, however, remained unpublished. The first map of the Moon was made by the Belgian cosmographer and astronomer Michael van Langren in 1645. Two years later a much more influential effort was published by Johannes Hevelius. In 1647, Hevelius published Selenographia, the first treatise entirely devoted to the Moon. Hevelius's nomenclature, although used in Protestant countries until the eighteenth century, was replaced by the system published in 1651 by the Jesuit astronomer Giovanni Battista Riccioli, who gave the large naked-eye spots the names of seas and the telescopic spots (since called craters) the names of philosophers and astronomers.

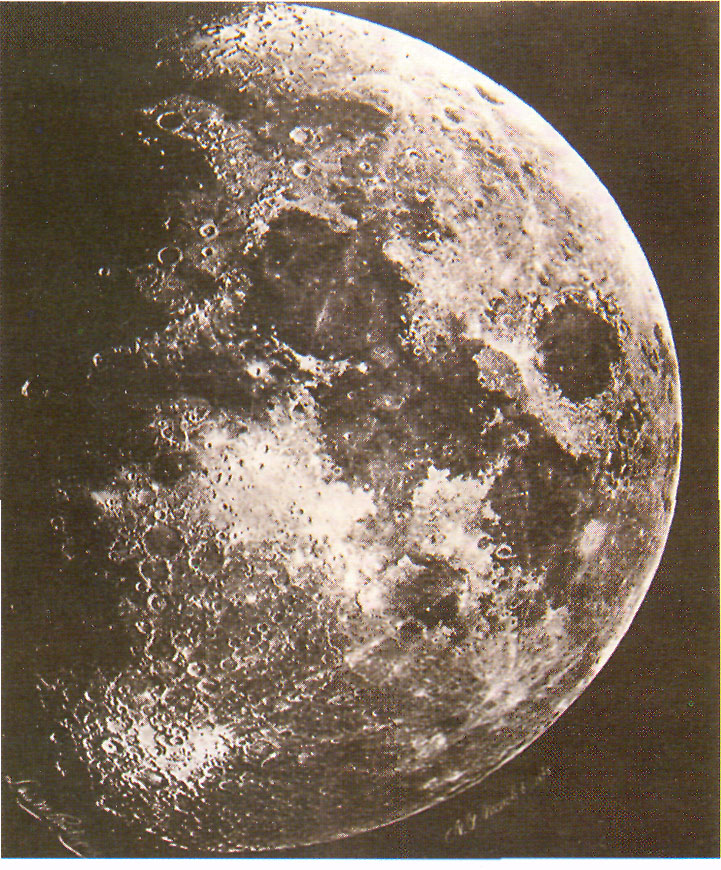
Photo of the Moon made by Lewis Rutherfurd in 1865.

In 1753, the Croatian Jesuit and astronomer Roger Joseph Boscovich discovered the absence of an atmosphere on the Moon. In 1824, Franz von Paula Gruithuisen explained the formation of craters as a result of meteorite strikes.

The since-disproven possibility that the Moon contains vegetation and is inhabited by selenites was seriously considered by major astronomers of the early modern period even into the first decades of the 19th century. In 1834–1836, Wilhelm Beer and Johann Heinrich Mädler published their four-volume Mappa Selenographica and the book Der Mond in 1837, which firmly established the conclusion that the Moon has no bodies of water nor any appreciable atmosphere.

== Space Race ==
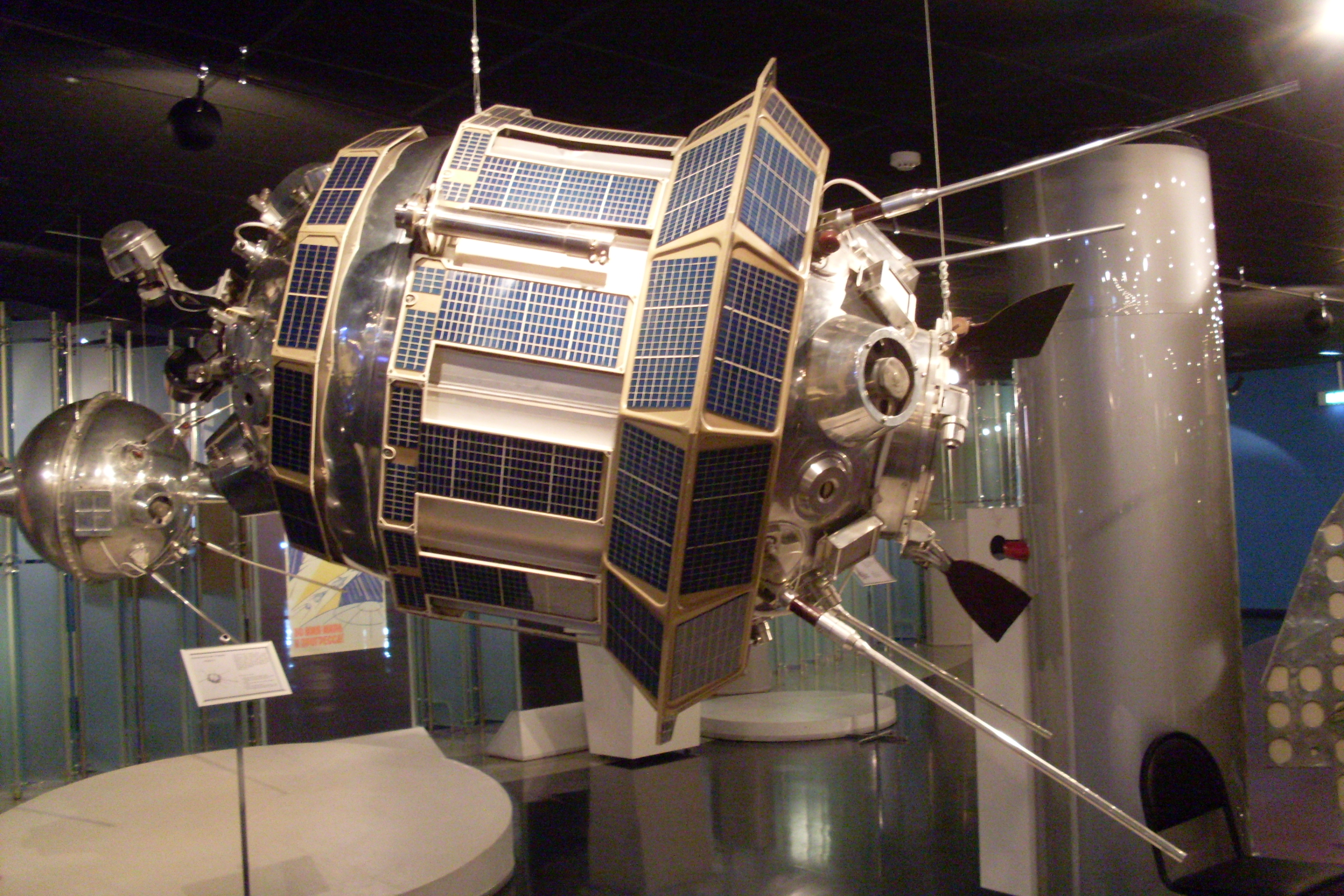
Scale model of Luna 3.

The Cold War-inspired "space race" and "Moon race" between the Soviet Union and the United States of America accelerated with a focus on the Moon. This included many scientifically important firsts, such as the first photographs of the far side of the Moon in 1959 by the Soviet Union, and culminated with the landing of the first humans on the Moon in 1969, seen around the world as one of the pivotal events of the 20th century and human history.

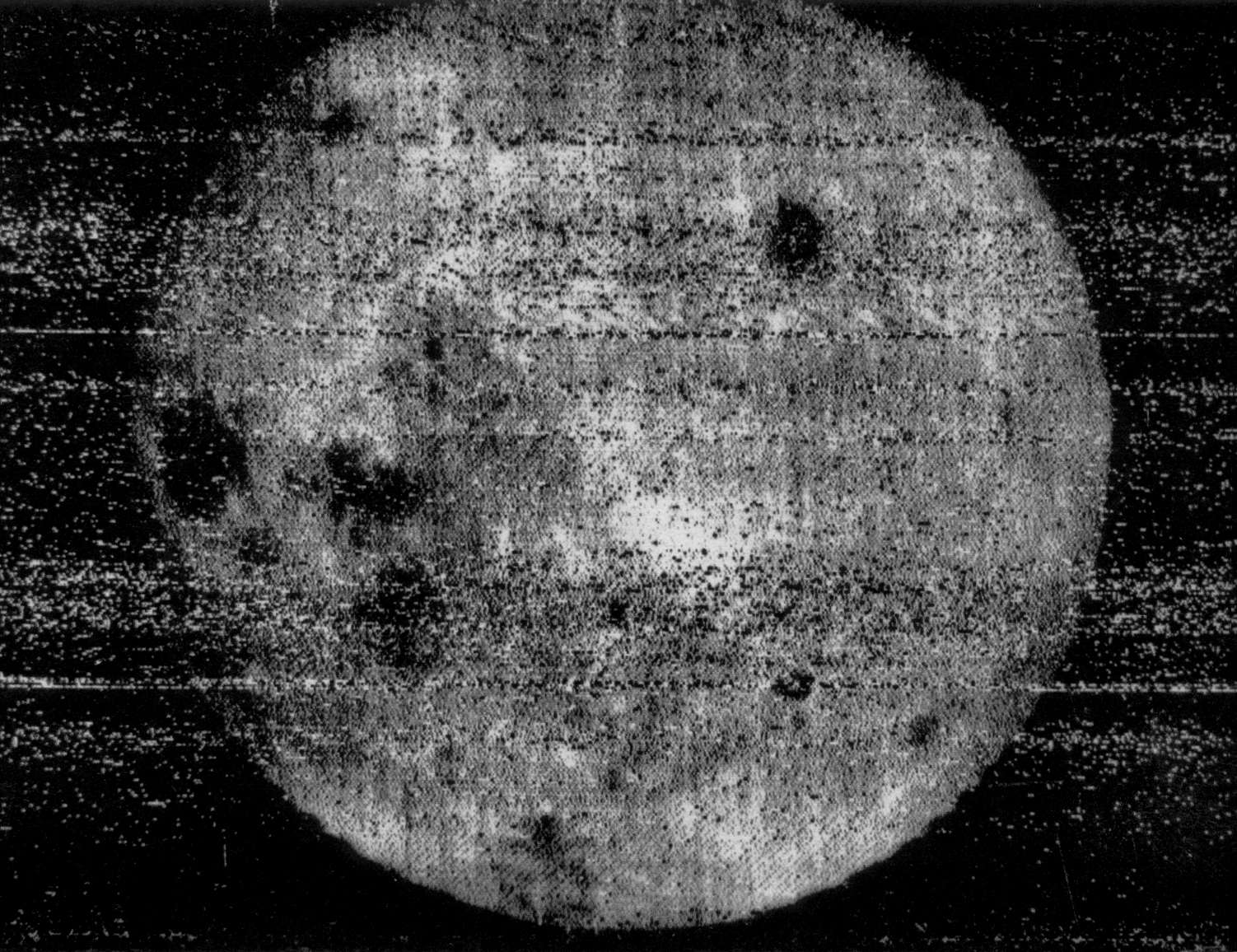
The first picture of another world from space, the Moon's far side photographed by Luna 3 in 1959.

The first artificial object to fly by the Moon was uncrewed Soviet probe Luna 1 on 4 January 1959, which went on to be the first probe to achieve a heliocentric orbit around the Sun. Luna 1 was designed to impact the surface of the Moon.

The first probe to impact the surface of the Moon was the Soviet probe Luna 2, which made a hard landing on September 14, 1959, at 21:02:24 UTC. The far side of the Moon was first photographed on 7 October 1959, by the Soviet probe Luna 3. Though vague by modern standards, the photos showed that the far side of the Moon almost completely lacked maria.

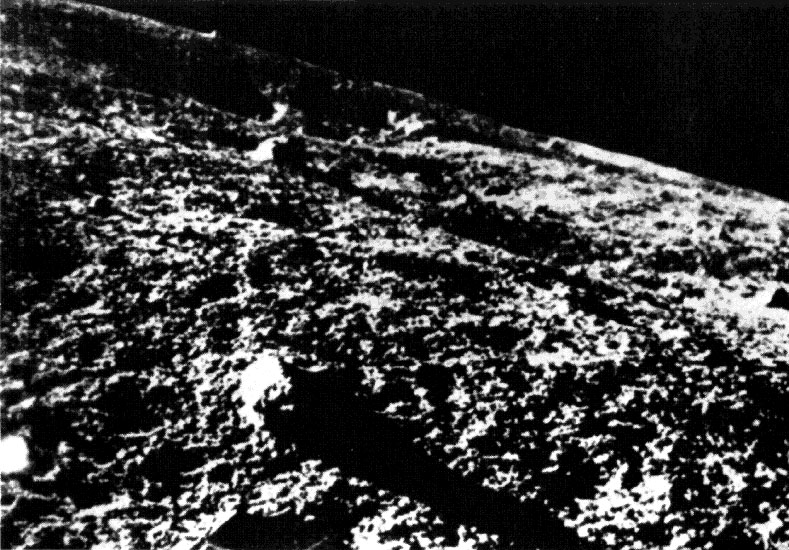
First photo taken from the surface of the Moon, by Luna 9, February 1966

The first American probe to fly by the Moon was Pioneer 4 on 4 March 1959, which occurred shortly after Luna 1. It was the only success of eight early American probes that attempted to launch to the Moon.

In an effort to compete with the Soviet successes, U.S. President John F. Kennedy proposed the Moon landing in a Special Message to the Congress on Urgent National Needs:

Now it is time to take longer strides – time for a great new American enterprise – time for this nation to take a clearly leading role in space achievement, which in many ways may hold the key to our future on Earth.
...For while we cannot guarantee that we shall one day be first, we can guarantee that any failure to make this effort will make us last.

...I believe that this nation should commit itself to achieving the goal, before this decade is out, of landing a man on the Moon and returning him safely to the Earth. No single space project in this period will be more impressive to mankind, or more important in the long-range exploration of space; and none will be so difficult or expensive to accomplish.

...let it be clear that I am asking the Congress and the country to accept a firm commitment to a new course of action—a course which will last for many years and carry very heavy costs...

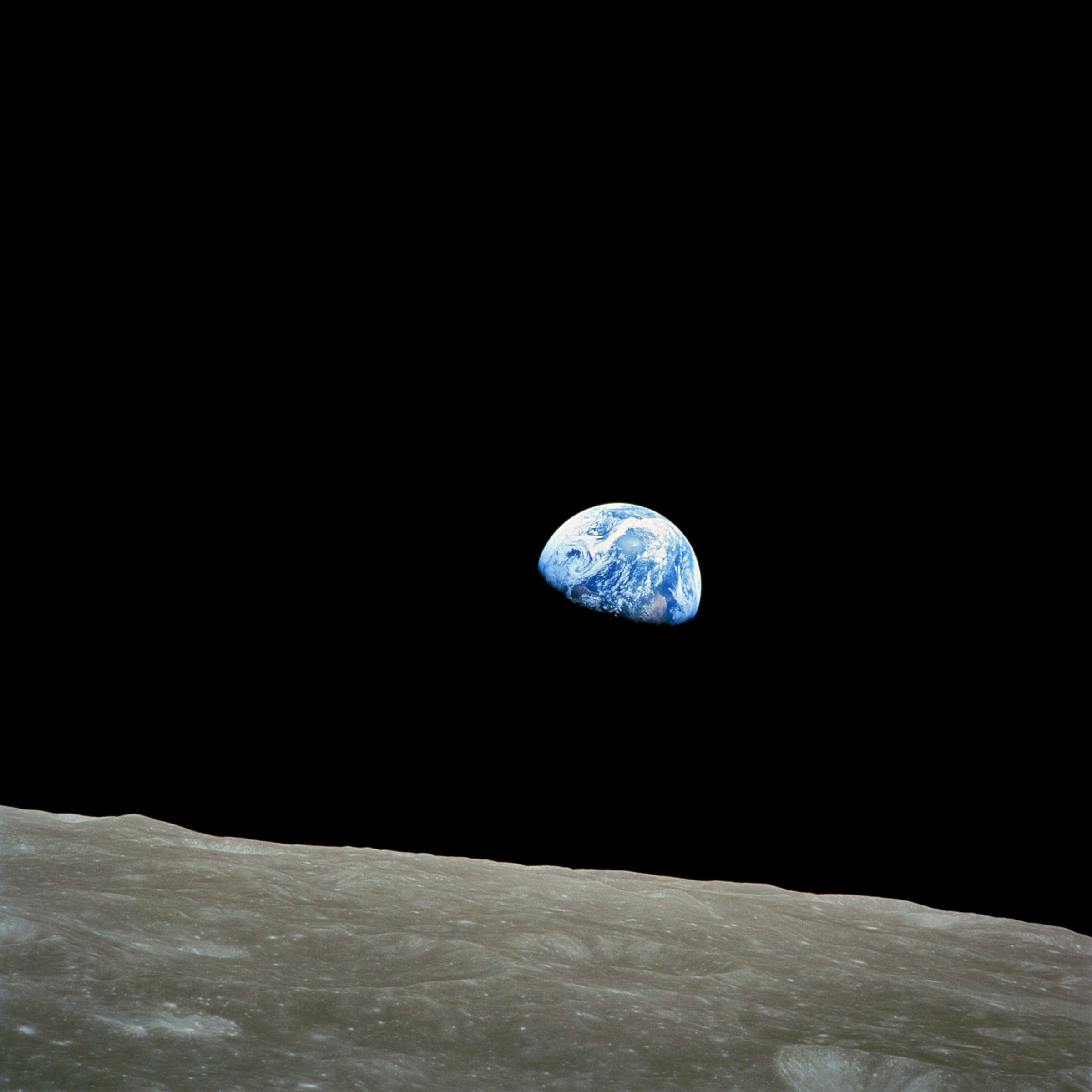
Earthrise taken by William Anders of Apollo 8 in December 1968.

Ranger 1 launched in August of 1961, just three months after President Kennedy's speech. It would be three more years and six failed Ranger missions until Ranger 7 returned close-up photos of the lunar surface before impacting it in July 1964. A number of problems with launch vehicles, ground equipment, and spacecraft electronics plagued the Ranger program and early probe missions. These lessons helped in Mariner 2, the only successful U.S. space probe after Kennedy's famous speech to Congress and before his death in November 1963. U.S. success rates improved greatly from Ranger 7 onward.

In 1966, the USSR accomplished the first soft landings and took the first pictures from the lunar surface during the Luna 9 and Luna 13 missions.

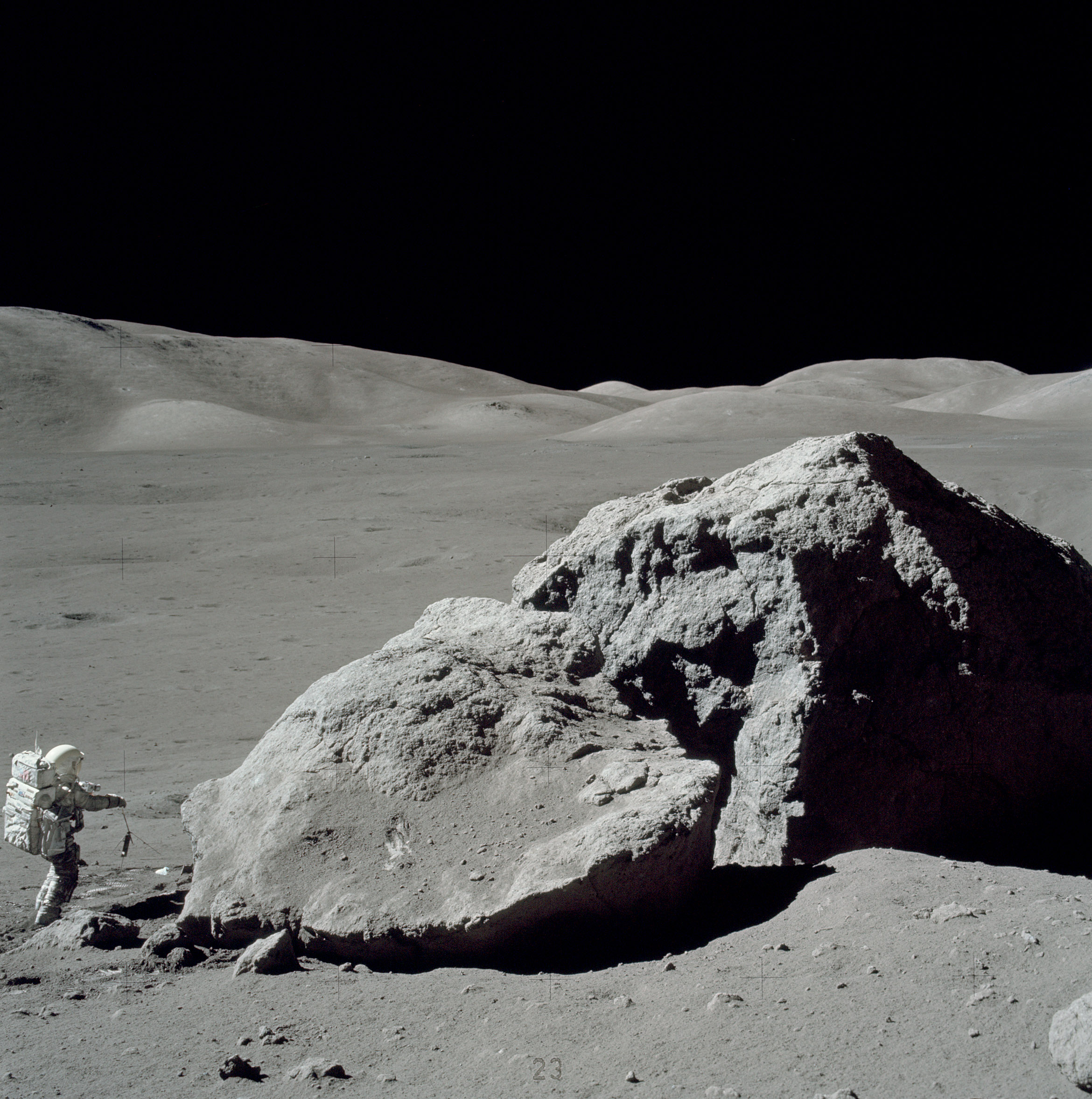
Apollo 17 astronaut Harrison Schmitt standing next to a boulder at Taurus-Littrow during the third EVA (extravehicular activity).

The U.S. followed Ranger with the Surveyor program sending seven robotic spacecraft to the surface of the Moon. Five of the seven spacecraft soft-landed, investigating whether the regolith (dust) was shallow enough for astronauts to stand on the Moon.

In September 1968 the Soviet Union's Zond 5 sent tortoises on a circumlunar mission, followed by turtles aboard Zond 6 in November. On December 24, 1968, the crew of Apollo 8—Frank Borman, James Lovell and William Anders—became the first human beings to enter lunar orbit and see the far side of the Moon in person. Humans first landed on the Moon on July 20, 1969. The first humans to walk on the lunar surface were Neil Armstrong, commander of the U.S. mission Apollo 11 and his fellow astronaut Buzz Aldrin.

The first robot lunar rover to land on the Moon was the Soviet vessel Lunokhod 1 on 17 November 1970, as part of the Lunokhod programme. Since then, the last human to stand on the Moon was Eugene Cernan, who, as part of the Apollo 17 mission, walked on the Moon in December 1972.

Moon rock samples were brought back to Earth by three Luna missions (Luna 16, 20, and 24) and the Apollo missions 11 through 17 (except Apollo 13, which aborted its planned lunar landing). Luna 24 in 1976 was the last Lunar mission by either the Soviet Union or the U.S. until Clementine in 1994. Focus shifted to probes to other planets, space stations, and the Shuttle program.

Before the "Moon race" the U.S. had preliminary projects for scientific and military Moon-bases: the Lunex Project and Project Horizon. Besides crewed landings, the abandoned Soviet crewed lunar programs included the building of a multipurpose Moon base "Zvezda", the first detailed project, complete with mockups of expedition vehicles and surface modules.

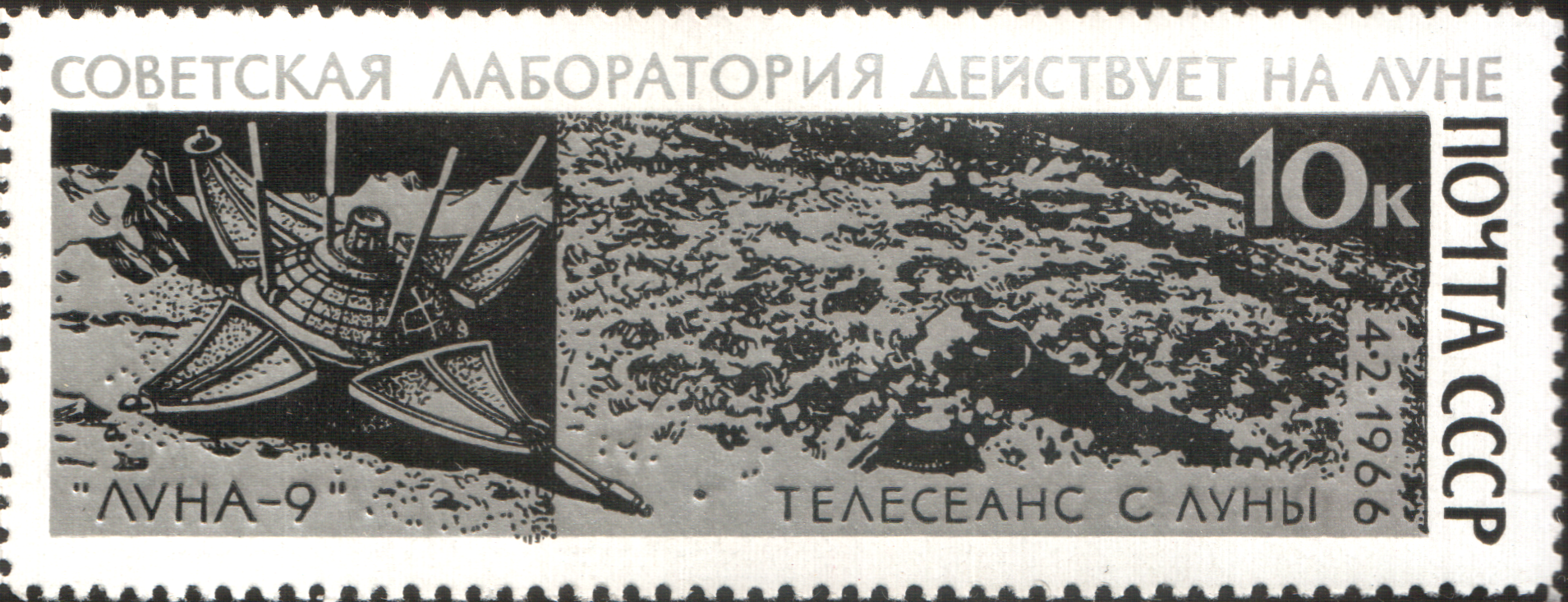
1966 stamp with a drawing of the first soft landed probe Luna 9, next to the first view of the lunar surface photographed by the probe.

== After 1990 ==
=== Japan ===
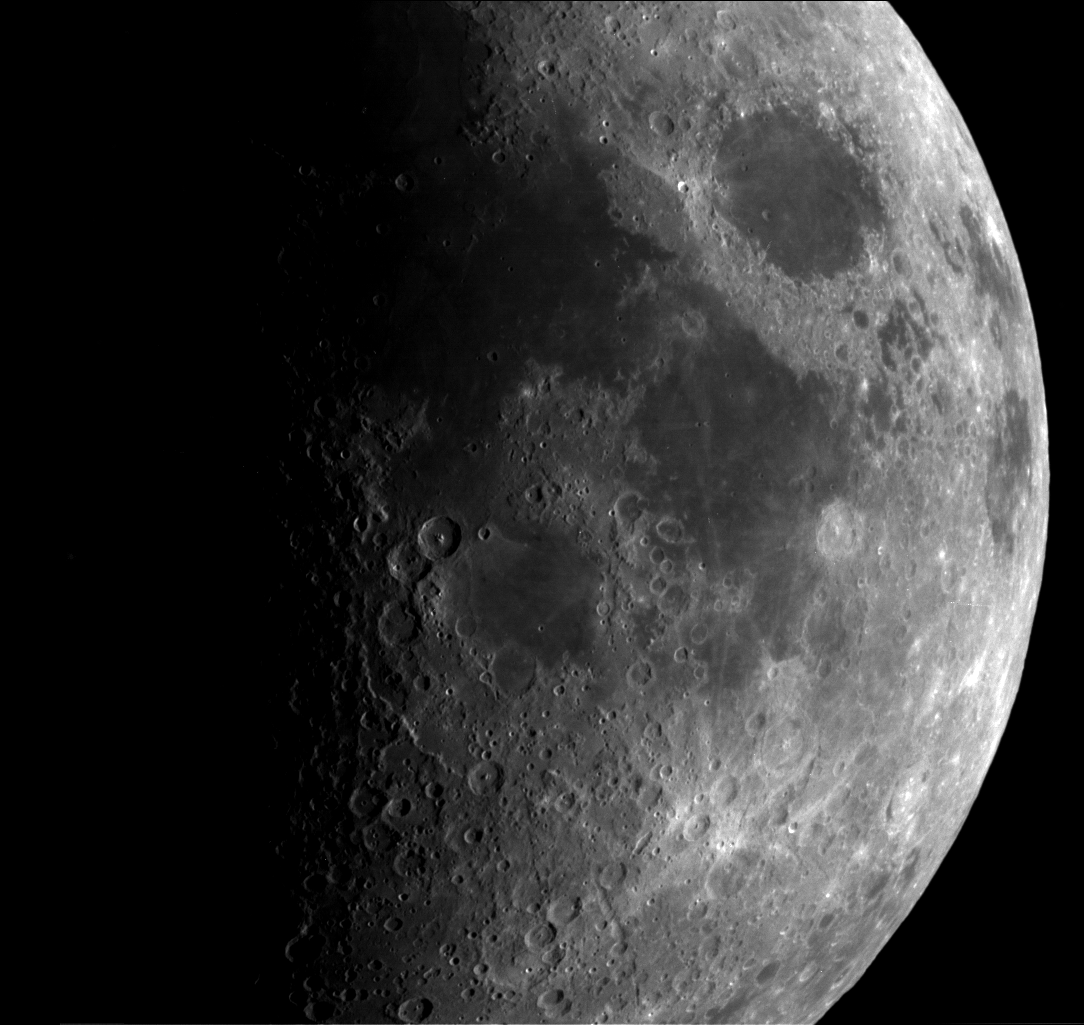
Cassini–Huygens took this image during its lunar flyby, before it traveled to Saturn.

Japan began its lunar exploration efforts in 1990 with the launch of the Hiten spacecraft by the Japan Aerospace Exploration Agency (JAXA), becoming the third country to place an object in orbit around the Moon. During the mission, Hiten deployed a smaller probe, Hagoromo, intended to enter lunar orbit. Although the probe was released successfully, its transmitter failed, preventing the return of scientific data.

In September of 2007, JAXA launched the SELENE spacecraft, also known as "Kaguya." The mission aimed to collect data on the Moon’s origin and geological evolution, as well as to test technologies for future lunar exploration. According to JAXA, the primary objective was "to obtain scientific data of the lunar origin and evolution and to develop the technology for future lunar exploration."

In 2013, JAXA initiated the Smart Lander for Investigating Moon (SLIM) mission, a lunar lander designed to demonstrate high-precision landing capabilities. The lander was initially scheduled for launch in 2021 but was delayed due to postponements related to its ride-share partner, the X-Ray Imaging and Spectroscopy Mission (XRISM). SLIM was launched on 6 September 2023 at 23:42 UTC (7 September 08:42 Japan Standard Time). The spacecraft performed its trans-lunar injection burn on 1 October 2023, entered lunar orbit on 25 December 2023, and successfully landed on 19 January 2024 at 15:20 UTC. With this landing, Japan became the fifth country to achieve a soft landing on the Moon.

Following the landing, SLIM experienced power generation issues but continued to operate intermittently. As of April 2024, the lander had survived four lunar days and three lunar nights, which are known for extreme temperature variations and pose significant challenges to spacecraft longevity.

=== European Space Agency ===
The European Space Agency launched the lunar orbiter SMART 1 on 27 September 2003, as a low-budget mission aimed at testing new technologies and conducting scientific observations. One of its main objectives was to capture three-dimensional X-ray and infrared images of the Moon’s surface. After a year-long journey, SMART 1 entered lunar orbit on November 15, 2004. It continued its survey work until September 3, 2006, when mission controllers directed it to impact the Moon deliberately to analyze the resulting debris plume.

=== China ===
China’s lunar exploration efforts are conducted through the Chinese Lunar Exploration Program, which includes scientific missions and assessments of potential lunar resources such as helium-3, an isotope considered for possible future use in terrestrial energy production.

The China National Space Administration (CNSA) launched the Chang'e 1 lunar orbiter on 24 October 2007. Initially intended to operate for one year, the mission was extended and concluded with a controlled impact on the Moon on 1 March 2009. A second orbiter, Chang'e 2, was launched on 1 October 2010.

On 14 December 2013, China successfully deployed the Chang'e 3 lander and the Yutu rover, becoming the third nation to achieve a lunar soft landing. It was the first soft landing on the lunar surface since Luna 24 in 1976. The backup spacecraft for Chang'e 3, originally constructed as a contingency, was repurposed for the Chang'e 4 mission, which targeted the far side of the Moon. Chang'e 4 was launched on 7 December 2018 and landed on 3 January 2019. The Yutu-2 rover, deployed by Chang'e 4, set a distance record for lunar surface travel. Its findings included the detection of a dust layer up to 12 meters deep in parts of the lunar far side.

A sample return mission, Chang'e 5, was initially planned for 2017 but was delayed following a failure of the Long March 5 launch vehicle. Following the rocket's successful return to flight in December 2019, CNSA launched Chang'e 5 in late 2020. The mission returned approximately 2 kilograms of lunar material to Earth on 16 December 2020.

The Chang'e 6 mission, launched on 3 May 2024, conducted the first sample return from the lunar far side, specifically the Apollo Basin. It carried a small rover, Jinchan, which conducted infrared spectroscopy and captured imagery of the lander on the surface.

The spacecraft’s lander-ascender-rover module separated from its orbiter and returner prior to landing on 1 June 2024 at 22:23 UTC. The ascender lifted off from the lunar surface on 3 June 2024 at 23:38 UTC, conducted an automated rendezvous and docking in lunar orbit, and transferred its sample container to the return module. The returner successfully landed in Inner Mongolia on 25 June 2024, completing China’s second lunar sample return mission and the first from the Moon’s far side.

=== India ===
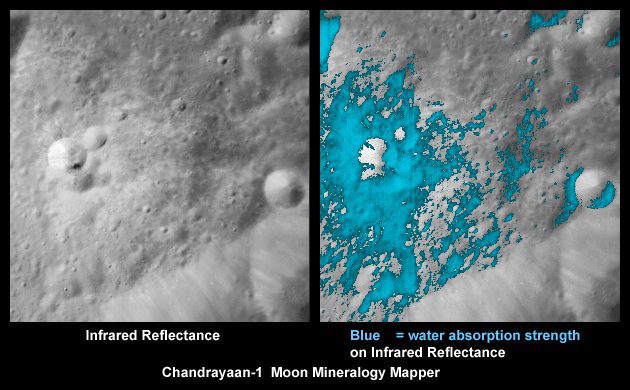
These images show a young lunar crater on the far side of the Moon, as viewed by Chandrayaan-1's Moon Mineralogy Mapper instrument.

India's national space agency, the Indian Space Research Organisation (ISRO), launched Chandrayaan-1, an uncrewed lunar orbiter, on 22 October 2008. The spacecraft was intended to operate for two years, with scientific objectives including the creation of a three-dimensional atlas of the near and far sides of the Moon and chemical and mineralogical mapping of the lunar surface.

The orbiter released the Moon Impact Probe, which impacted the lunar surface at 15:04 GMT on 14 November 2008. Among its key findings, Chandrayaan-1 detected the widespread presence of water molecules in the lunar regolith.

This mission was succeeded by Chandrayaan-2, launched on 22 July 2019, which entered lunar orbit on 20 August 2019. It carried India’s first lander and rover; however, due to a technical anomaly during the final descent, the lander crashed on the lunar surface.

Chandrayaan-3, ISRO's third lunar exploration mission, was launched on 14 July 2023 and featured a lander, Vikram, and a rover, Pragyan. The lander successfully achieved a soft landing near the lunar south pole on 23 August 2023, making India the fourth country to achieve a soft landing on the Moon and the first to land near the south polar region.

=== United States ===
The Ballistic Missile Defense Organization and NASA launched the Clementine mission in 1994 and Lunar Prospector in 1998.

Animation of Lunar Reconnaissance Orbiter's trajectory from June 23, 2009, to June 30, 2009 Lunar Reconnaissance Orbiter · Moon

NASA launched the Lunar Reconnaissance Orbiter, on June 18, 2009, which has collected imagery of the Moon's surface. It also carried the Lunar Crater Observation and Sensing Satellite (LCROSS), which investigated the possible existence of water in the crater Cabeus. GRAIL is another mission, launched in 2011.

Following the decades-long lull in lunar exploration in the aftermath of the Cold War, the main push of US lunar exploration goals has coalesced under the Artemis program, formulated in 2017.

=== Russia ===
On 10 August 2023, Russia launched the Luna 25 mission, its first mission to the Moon since 1976. On 20 August, it crashed into the Moon after a guidance error that resulted in an anomalous orbit-lowering manoeuvre.

=== South Korea ===
South Korea launched the lunar orbiter Danuri on 4 August 2022, and it arrived at the Moon on 16 December 2022. This was the first phase of South Korea's lunar exploration program, with plans to launch another lunar lander and probe.

=== Pakistan ===
Pakistan sent a lunar orbiter called ICUBE-Q along with Chang'e 6.

=== Commercial missions ===
In 2007, the X Prize Foundation, together with Google, launched the Google Lunar X Prize to encourage commercial endeavors to the Moon. A prize of $20 million was to be awarded to the first private venture to get to the Moon with a robotic lander by the end of March 2018, with additional prizes worth $10 million for further milestones. As of August 2016, 16 teams were reportedly participating in the competition. In January 2018 the foundation announced that the prize would go unclaimed, as none of the finalist teams would be able to make a launch attempt by the deadline.

In August 2016, the US government granted permission to US-based start-up Moon Express to land on the Moon. This marked the first time that a private enterprise was given the right to do so. The decision is regarded as a precedent helping to define regulatory standards for deep-space commercial activity in the future. Previously, private companies were restricted to operating on or around Earth.

On 29 November 2018, NASA announced that nine commercial companies would compete to win a contract to send small payloads to the Moon in what is known as Commercial Lunar Payload Services. According to NASA administrator Jim Bridenstine, "We are building a domestic American capability to get back and forth to the surface of the moon.".

The first commercial mission to the Moon was accomplished by the Manfred Memorial Moon Mission (4M), led by LuxSpace, an affiliate of German OHB AG. The mission was launched on 23 October 2014 with the Chinese Chang'e 5-T1 test spacecraft, attached to the upper stage of a Long March 3C/G2 rocket. The 4M spacecraft made a Moon flyby on the night of October 28, 2014, after which it entered elliptical Earth orbit, exceeding its designed lifetime by four times.

The Beresheet lander, operated by Israel Aerospace Industries and SpaceIL impacted the Moon on April 11, 2019, after a failed landing attempt.

Blue Ghost Mission 1, a robotic Moon landing mission conducted by Firefly Aerospace, launched on January 15, 2025, and landed on March 2, 2025, at 08:34 UTC.

== Plans ==
Following the abandoned US Constellation program, plans for crewed flights followed by moonbases were declared by Russia, ESA, China, Japan, India, and South Korea. All of them intend to continue the exploration of the Moon with more uncrewed spacecraft.

India is planning, and it is studying a potential collaboration with Japan to launch the Lunar Polar Exploration Mission in 2026–2028.

Russia also announced plans to resume its previously frozen project Luna-Glob, an uncrewed lander and orbiter, which was slated to launch in 2021 but did not manifest. In 2015, Roscosmos stated that Russia plans to place an astronaut on the Moon by 2030, leaving Mars to NASA. The purpose is to work jointly with NASA and avoid a space race.

In 2018, NASA released plans to return to the Moon with commercial and international partners as part of an overall agency Exploration Campaign in support of Space Policy Directive 1, giving rise to the Artemis program and the Commercial Lunar Payload Services (CLPS). NASA plans to start with robotic missions on the lunar surface, as well as the crewed Lunar Gateway space station. As of 2019, NASA is issuing contracts to develop new small lunar payload delivery services, develop lunar landers, and conduct more research on the Moon's surface ahead of a human return. The Artemis program involves several flights of the Orion spacecraft and lunar landings from 2022 to 2028.

On November 3, 2021, NASA announced it had picked a landing site in the lunar south polar region near the crater Shackleton for an uncrewed spacecraft that included NASA's Polar Resources Ice-Mining Experiment-1. The precise location was termed the Shackleton Connecting Ridge, which has near-continuous solar exposure and line-of-sight with Earth for communication.

ESA's Moonlight Initiative aims to create a small network of communication and navigation satellites orbiting the Moon to support the Artemis landings. These would enable communication with Earth even when out of direct line-of-sight. They would also provide navigation signals similar to the Global Positioning System on Earth, requiring precision timekeeping. Moonlight planners have proposed creating a new time zone for the Moon for this purpose, culminating in the introduction of the Coordinated Lunar Time standard in 2024. Due to the lower gravity and relative motion, time passes more quickly on the Moon, making every 24-hour period elapse 56 microseconds early when measured from Earth.

== See also ==
- Artemis program
- Colonization of the Moon
- Tourism on the Moon
- Lunar outpost (NASA)
- International Lunar Exploration Working Group
- List of artificial objects on the Moon
- List of Apollo astronauts
- List of lunar probes
- List of missions to the Moon
- Lunar resources
- Moon landing
- Timeline of Solar System exploration
- Starship HLS
