= NovaMoon =

European Lunar surface mission for satellite navigation on the Moon

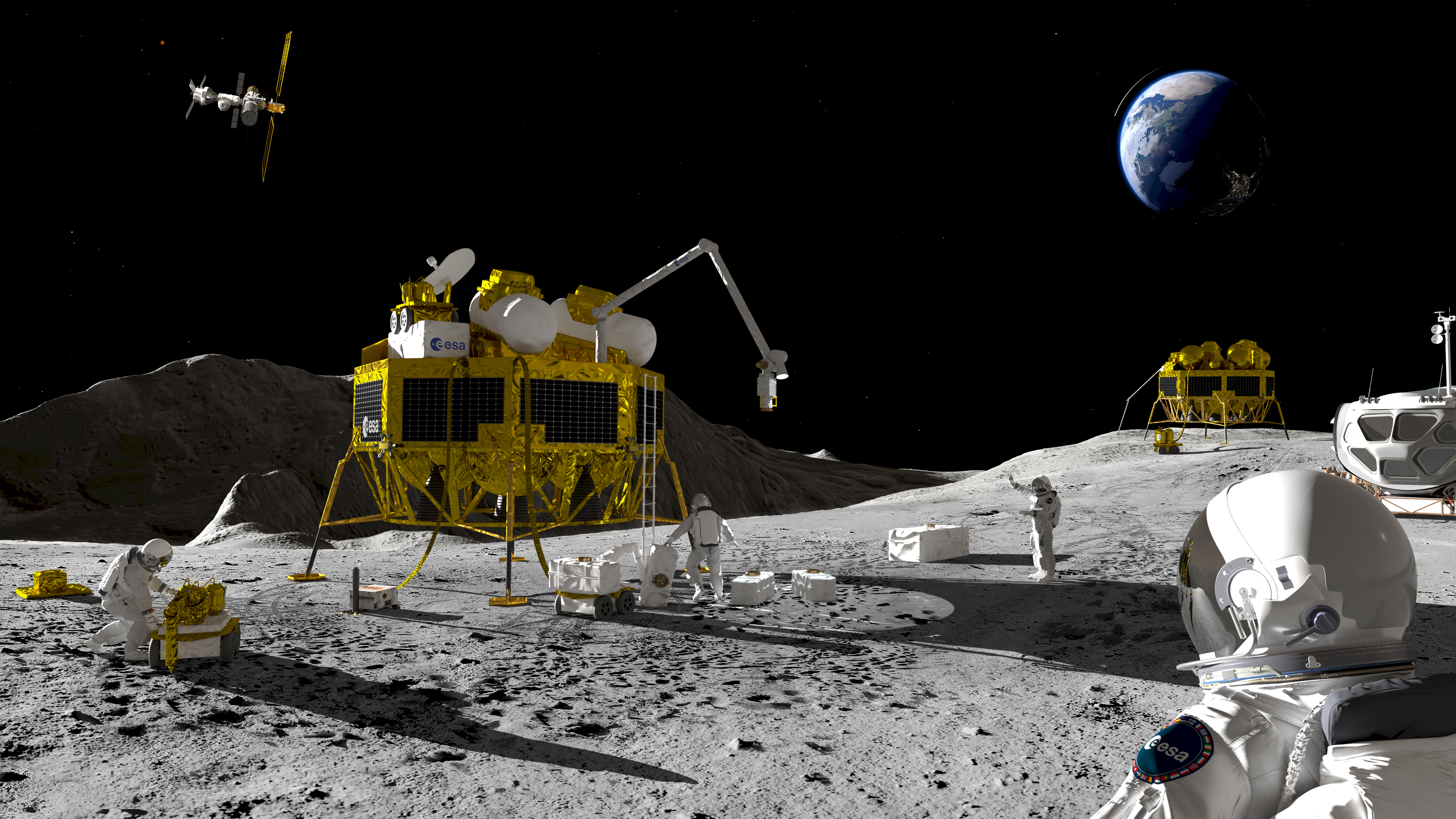
- Argonaut lunar lander
- Mission type: Moon landing for GNSS augmentation
- Operator: European Space Agency
- Mission duration: 5 years (planned)

Start of mission
- Launch date: 2030s (planned)
- Rocket: Ariane 64

NovaMoon is a planned Lunar surface mission by the European Space Agency (ESA) designed to improve positioning, navigation, and timing (PNT) services on the Moon. NovaMoon will improve the accuracy of ESA's orbital system Moonlight by providing a selenodetic surface reference station, enabling sub-metre positioning on the Moon. It will also place the first atomic clocks on the Moon's surface that will contribute to establishing Lunar Reference Time. The system will be delivered in three phases on multiple lunar landers, culminating in the full system delivered in final configuration on the second flight of ESA's Argonaut lander.

== See also ==
- List of European Space Agency programmes and missions
- List of missions to the Moon
- Terrae Novae – European programme for human spaceflight and robotic space exploration
- Artemis program – NASA-led lunar exploration program
- LunaNet – Space network project
