= Lunar Pathfinder =

European communication satellite for the Moon

- Mission type: Lunar communications satellite
- Operator: European Space Agency
- Website: https://bsgn.esa.int/service/lunar-pathfinder/

Spacecraft properties
- Manufacturer: (United Kingdom) SSTL

Start of mission
- Launch date: NET 2027
- Rocket: Falcon 9

Lunar Pathfinder is a future lunar communications satellite and a precursor to the Moonlight constellation, under development by the European Space Agency (ESA). Its purpose is to relay data between Earth and spacecraft operating around and on the Moon. It is expected to launch in 2027 with the Firefly Aerospace's Blue Ghost Mission 2.

== Instruments ==
Apart from its communication equipment, Lunar Pathfinder also carries multiple scientific and technology demonstration payloads:

- RADMON (Thales Alenia Space in Switzerland) – characterisation of radiation conditions around the Moon
- GNSS receiver (SpacePNT in Switzerland) – testing the use of Earth navigation satellite systems around the Moon
- Laser retroreflector (NASA) – laser ranging measurements between Earth and lunar orbit
- X-band transponder (Thales Alenia Space in Spain) – two-way radio ranging measurements

== History ==
In April 2018, the ESA signed a collaboration agreement with Surrey Satellite Technology (SSTL) and Goonhilly Earth Station (GES) for Commercial Lunar Mission Support Services (CLMSS). The agreement included collaboration on the Lunar Pathfinder mission. In October 2019, the Lunar Pathfinder mission was in its pilot phase and had its first business review successfully completed. In March 2023, ESA selected Firefly Aerospace to deliver Lunar Pathfinder to lunar orbit via the Blue Ghost vehicle. In October 2026, the spacecraft was undergoing final environmental test campaign in the UK.

== See also ==
- List of European Space Agency programmes and missions
