= Blue Ghost Mission 2 =

2026 lunar landing mission

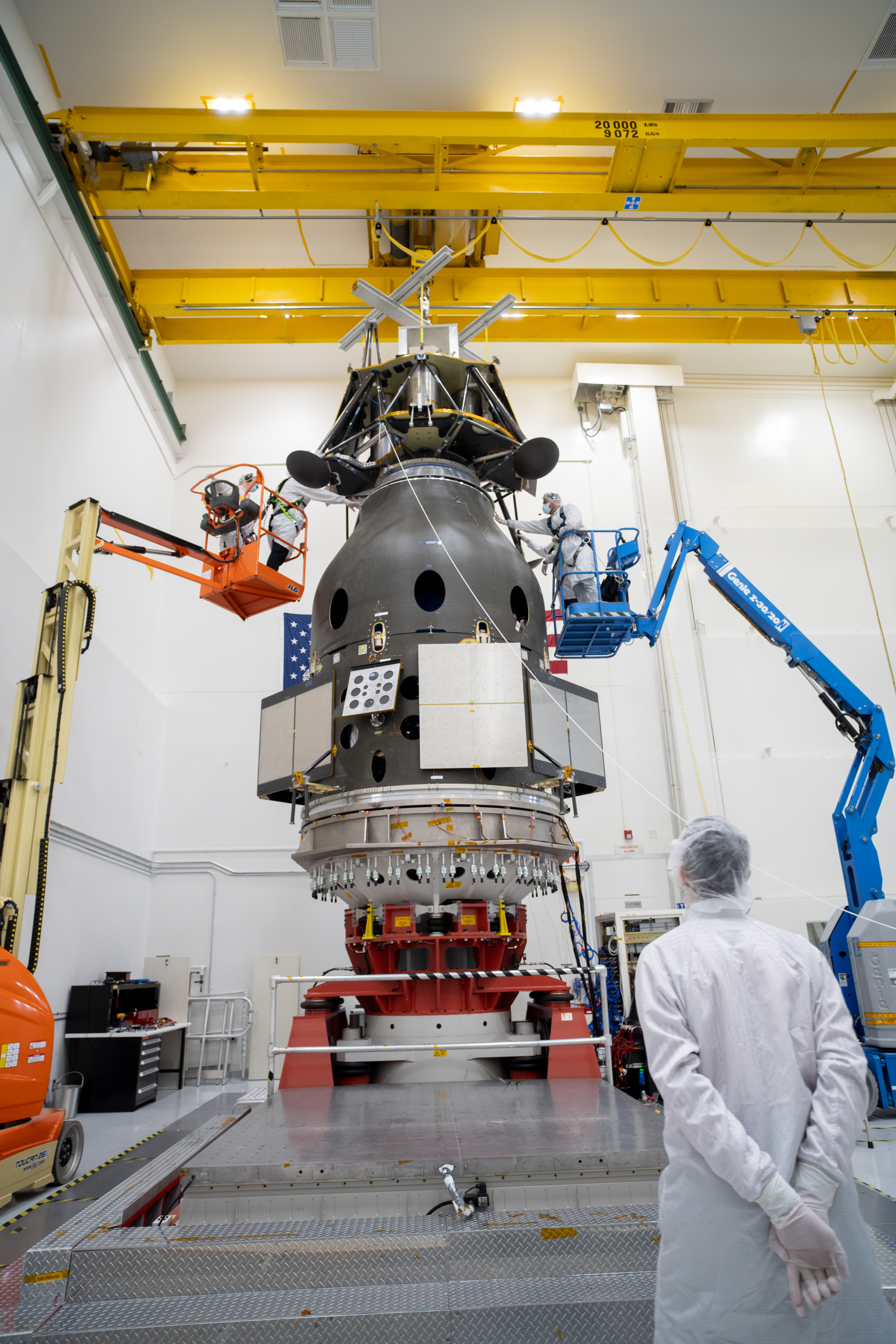
- Engineers and technicians secure a full-scale model of Firefly’s Blue Ghost lunar lander atop the other spacecraft that make up the company’s second delivery to the lunar surface.
- Names: CLPS CS-3/4
- Mission type: Lunar landing
- Operator: Firefly Aerospace

Spacecraft properties
- Spacecraft type: Blue Ghost
- Manufacturer: Firefly Aerospace
- Dry mass: 469 kg (1,034 lb)
- Dimensions: Height: 2 m (6 ft 7 in); Width: 3.5 m (11 ft)
- Power: 400 watts

Start of mission
- Launch date: 2027
- Rocket: Falcon 9 Block 5
- Contractor: SpaceX

Lunar lander
- Landing site: lunar far side
- Blue Ghost Mission 2 mission patch Firefly Aerospace Blue Ghost Commercial Lunar Payload Services

Blue Ghost Mission 2 is a robotic spaceflight mission planned by NASA and Firefly Aerospace for launch in 2027. The mission includes three spacecraft that will be launched together on a SpaceX Falcon 9 Block 5 launch vehicle. The Elytra orbital transfer vehicle will insert the Blue Ghost lander and the Lunar Pathfinder satellite into lunar orbit. The lander will then carry science experiments and technology demonstration payloads to the lunar farside, where it will deploy a seismometer and a rover and operate a radio telescope. The mission is led by Firefly's Vice-President for Spacecraft Ray Allensworth.

== Spacecraft ==
=== Blue Ghost ===
Designed, manufactured and operated by Firefly Aerospace, Blue Ghost landers deliver small payloads to the surface of the Moon.

=== Lunar Pathfinder ===
Lunar Pathfinder is a communications satellite precursor to the Moonlight Initiative constellation. Surrey Satellite Technology developed Lunar Pathfinder in coordination with the European Space Agency. Its inclusion on the mission was sponsored through the NASA Commercial Lunar Payload Services (CLPS) program.

=== Elytra orbital transfer vehicle ===
Elytra is a space tug which will insert Blue Ghost and Lunar Pathfinder into lunar orbit once they are near the Moon.

== Lander payloads ==
=== Lunar Surface Electromagnetic Experiment at Night (LuSEE-Night) ===
LuSEE-Night is a NASA CLPS radio telescope, developed in collaboration with the United States Department of Energy (DOE), that is permanently attached to the top deck of the lander. It will charge an internal battery during lunar daytime for operations during lunar nights. The Blue Ghost lander will deactivate all of its systems at the end of the first day on the lunar surface, but LuSEE-Night is expected to function for up to two years.

LuSEE-Night's measurements of low frequency radio waves will provide information about the early history of the universe. LuSEE-Night is designed to deliver first-of-its-kind measurements of the so-called Dark Ages of the Universe. Its data will be delivered to Earth via ESA's Lunar Pathfinder.

=== User Terminal (UT) ===
The UT is a NASA CLPS payload developed by JPL. It will be used to commission the Lunar Pathfinder orbiter.

=== Seismic Payload for Interplanetary Discovery, Exploration, and Research (SPIDER) ===
Once deployed to the surface SPIDER will collect seismic data while remaining tethered to Blue Ghost. SPIDER is part of the Australian Space Agency Moon to Mars initiative. The SPIDER hardware from Fleet Space uses ambient noise tomography to collect subsurface data and search for water ice deposits.

=== Rashid Rover 2 ===
Once on the lunar surface, the lander will deploy a payload developed by the Emirates Lunar Mission. The first Rashid rover was lost when the Hakuto-R Mission 1 landing failed.

=== LightPort Wireless Power Receiver ===
Also on the lander's top deck, the LightPort wireless power receiver is a technology demonstration of the LightGrid power network being developed by Canadian company Volta Space Technologies.

== History ==
In March 2026, the launch was expected to be no earlier than December 2026. In October 2026, the lander was still lacking its engines and other propulsion components. The launch was expected to take place in 2027.

== See also ==
- Far side of the Moon
