= Ray Allensworth =

American spacecraft business executive and engineer

- Allensworth hosting SpaceX livestream of launch event for Blue Ghost Mission 1 Lunar Landing
- Born: 1993 (age 32–33)
- Education: University of Texas at Austin (BS)
- Occupations: Business executive; Engineer
- Organization: Vice President of Spacecraft at Firefly Aerospace
- Awards: Time 100 Next 2025

Ray Allensworth is an American business executive and engineer who has served as the Vice President of Spacecraft at Firefly Aerospace since 2026. She previously served as the company's Spacecraft Program Director, where she worked on Blue Ghost Mission 1 in 2025. This mission was the first time a private company successfully landed a spacecraft on the moon. She was selected as a Time 100 Next that same year.

== Biography ==
Allensworth earned her bachelor's degree from the University of Texas at Austin, where she studied civil engineering. She then went on to work at Northrop Grumman and Raytheon.

She moved back to Texas and took a job as a deputy program manager at Firefly Aerospace, working on the project that was then called 19D but since became known as Blue Ghost Mission 1, a mission focused on gathering lunar data. She later became program manager for that same mission, before becoming Spacecraft Program Director for Firefly Aerospace by 2025.

As Spacecraft Program Director, her focus was still on Mission 1. The mission made history on March 2, 2025, when Blue Ghost Mission 1 became the first private spacecraft to successfully land on the moon. As Spacecraft Program Manager, she also became one of the media contacts. Since then, she focused on Blue Ghost Mission 2. Her stated goal is to shorten the time between launches until they reach a roughly annual cycle.

She was made one of the Time 100 Next in 2025: her profile was written by Jeffrey Kluger. She was also named one of the Via Satellite Rising Stars that same year.

On May 6, 2026, she was promoted to the role of Vice President of Aerospace.
