= Argonaut (lunar lander) =

European Space Agency lunar lander

- Manufacturer: Thales Alenia Space
- Operator: European Space Agency
- Applications: Lunar payload delivery and support

Specifications
- Spacecraft type: Uncrewed lunar lander
- Launch mass: 9,900 kg (21,800 lb)
- Payload capacity: up to 1,500 kg (3,300 lb)

Dimensions
- Length: 6 m (20 ft)
- Diameter: 4.5 m (15 ft)

Production
- Status: In development
- Built: none
- Maiden launch: 2030 (planned)

Related spacecraft
- Launch vehicle: Ariane 64

Argonaut (originally known as European Large Logistics Lander, EL3) is a lunar landers designed by the European Space Agency (ESA) to deliver payloads to the surface of the Moon. The lander is being designed with a versatile set of uses in mind, including use as a robotics payloads, science, cargo delivery, and infrastructure (power, communication, etc.) delivery. It is envisioned to launch on the Ariane 64 launch vehicle.

== Architecture ==
The Argonaut lander consists of three main elements:

- LDE (Lunar Descent Element)
- CPE (Cargo Platform Element)
- Payloads

The CPE and the payloads together are usually referred as the passenger. The LDE is the recurring platform that will deliver up to 1,500 kg (3,300 lb) passenger. The CPE is mission specific.

The LDE propulsion system is based on 3 engines (RELIANCE, developed by NAMMO UK) as well as a separated reaction control system consisting of 24 monopropellant thrusters. Each of the three main engines, using electric pumps and MMH/MON as propellants, will be able of generating 6 kN of thrust and will be throttleable to 50%.

== Background ==
The lander is being developed under the ESA's Terrae Novae programme for crewed and robotic space exploration. Thales Alenia Space (Italy) is the prime contractor and system integrator for the Lunar Descent Element. Thales Alenia Space (France) is developing data-handling subsystems and computers. OHB System AG (Germany) is responsible for guidance, navigation, and control systems, as well as communication and electrical power systems including solar arrays and batteries. Thales Alenia Space (UK) is providing propulsion subsystems including propellant tanks. Nammo (UK) is providing the RELIANCE main engine.

== History ==
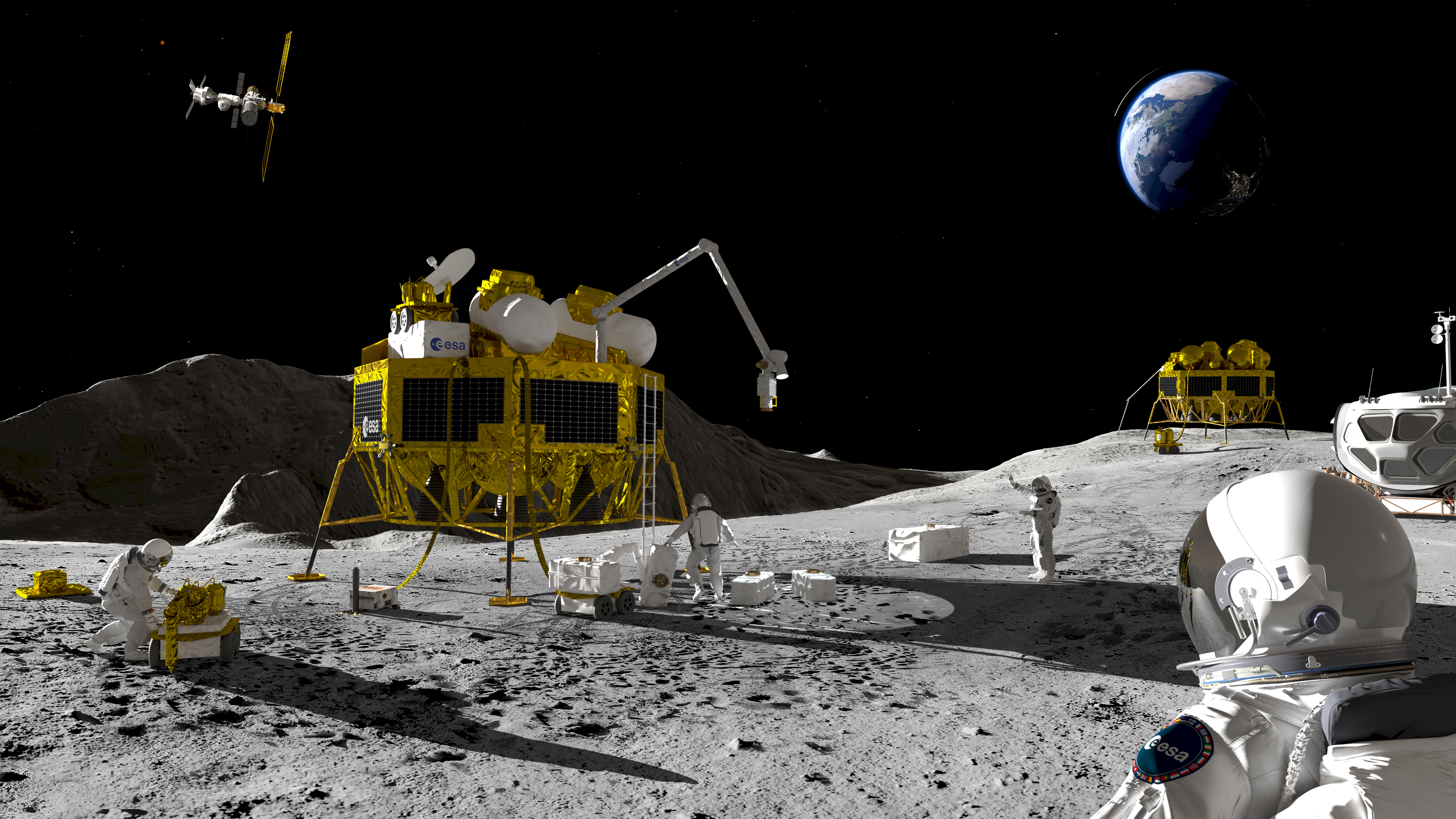
Artist's view of Argonaut on the Moon

In 2022, ESA successfully sought funding for the lander at its ministerial council. In 2023, the invitation to Tender for the prime contractor of the LDE was issued. Two engines were originally considered for the lander's main engine: the SPE-T developed by ArianeGroup and tested first in 2024, and the RELIANCE engine by Nammo.

In September 2024, Thales Alenia Space (Italy) initiated the development of the LDE-Mk1 (selecting at the time the RELIANCE engine) with the contract signed on the 30th January 2025. Later in 2025, Thales Alenia Space signed agreements with Thales Alenia Space in France, OHB in Germany, and Thales Alenia Space and Nammo in the United Kingdom for supplying various subsystems of the Lunar Descent Element.

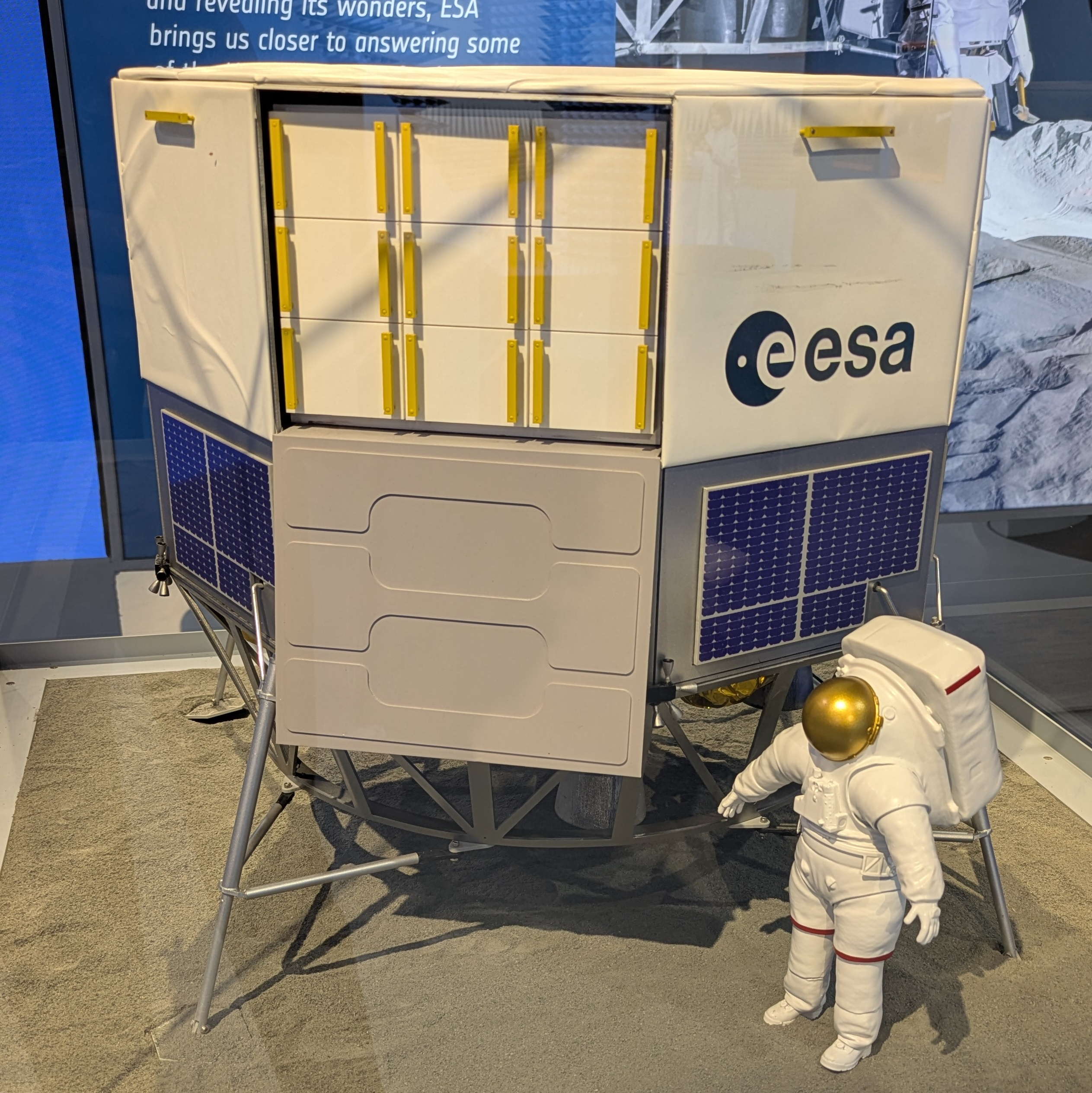
Model of Argonaut at Paris Air Show in 2025

The first mission of Argonaut is scheduled for 2030, featuring as primary objective the safe landing on the South Pole and the delivery of 2 technology demonstrator payloads for which ESA opened the "Argonaut 1 Moon Robotic Payload Mission" call for proposals In April 2026.

== Missions ==
=== Argonaut Mission 1 ===
Argonaut's first mission, launching in 2030, will land in the Lunar south pole region, carrying technology demonstration payloads. The two technology demonstrator payloads are MRP (Moon Robotic Payload), focused on dexterity and Manipulation and RSMA (Robotic Surface Mobility Asset), focused on mobility.

=== ArgoNET ===
The ArgoNET (Argo Navigation, Energy, and Telecommunications) concept was studied at the level of phase A in 2025. The concept aimed at delivering navigation, energy, and telecommunications infrastructure, serving as a selenodetic reference station for the Moonlight satellite constellation. ArgoNET includes the NovaMoon system, designed to enhance the accuracy of the Moonlight initiative's satellite navigation services to reach sub-meter levels across the entire Lunar south pole.

=== OASIS and ECHO ===
The Outpost for Advanced Scientific Investigation Station (OASIS) is a lunar service station on Argonaut designed to provide power, communications, and data services to payloads on the lunar surface. If approved, this concept could be demonstrated on an Argonaut mission carrying the Environment Characterisation and Heliophysics Observatory (ECHO), a suite of instruments for investigating Moon's environment including charged particles, exosphere, and lunar dust.

=== Astrophysical Lunar Observatory ===
If approved, the Astrophysical Lunar Observatory (ALO) will be a low-frequency radio interferometer on the far side of the Moon consisting of several hundred antennas. The observatory is expected to be deployed by Argonaut around 2035.

== See also ==
- List of ESA programmes and missions
- Moonlight Initiative
- Lunar Lander
- HERACLES
