= LunaNet =

Space network project

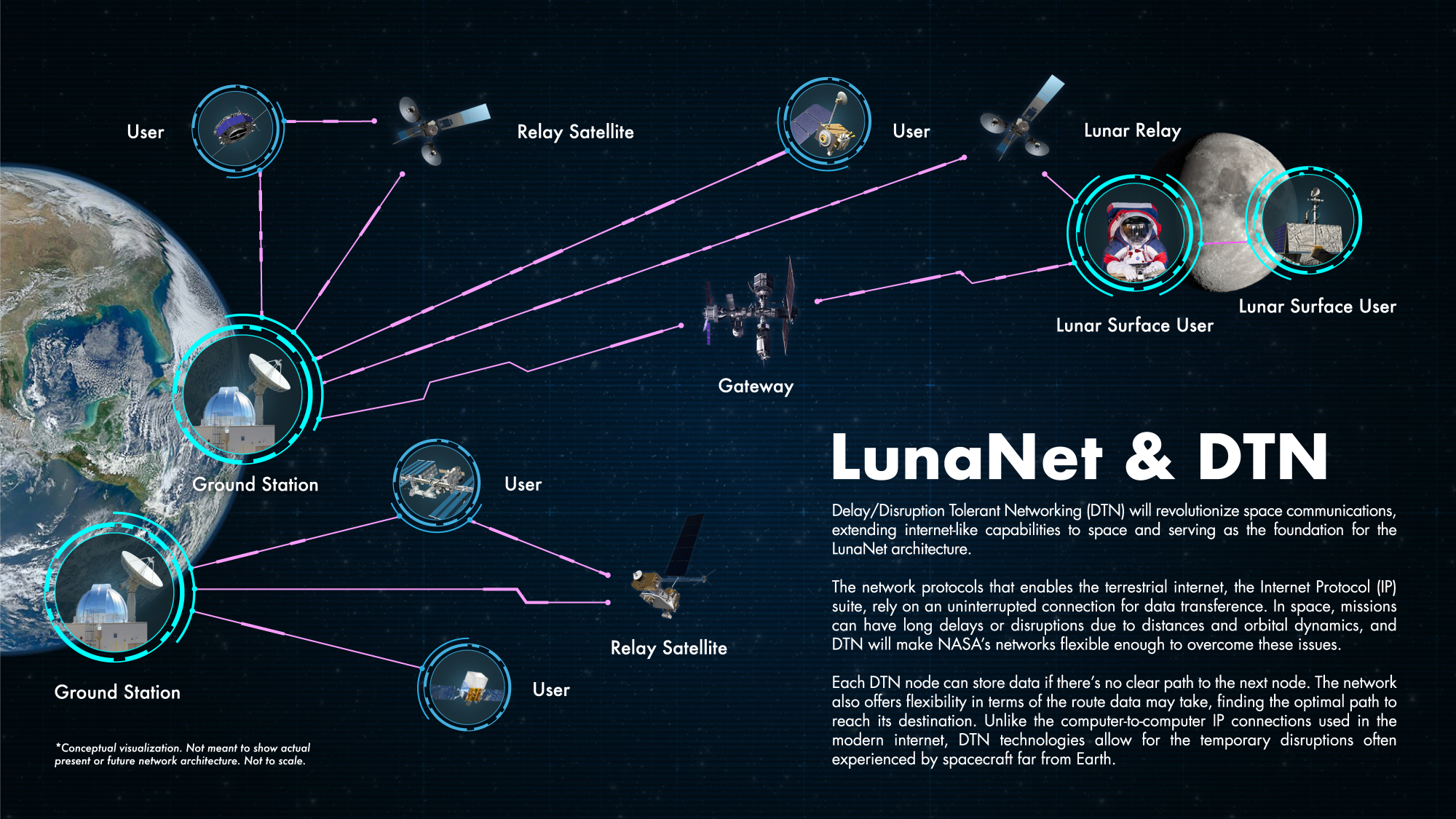
LunaNet DTN Framework

LunaNet is a NASA, ESA and JAXA project and proposed data network aiming to provide a "Lunar Internet" for cis-lunar spacecraft and installations.

It will be able to store-and-forward data to provide a Delay/Disruption Tolerant Network (DTN). The objective is to avoid needing to preschedule data communications back to Earth.

LunaNet will also offer navigation services, eg. for orbit determination, and navigation on the lunar surface.

Draft interoperability specifications have been issued.

The LunaNet Interoperability Specification (LNIS) is the document which publishes the LunaNet standard. LNIS version 4 was published online in September 12, 2022. LNIS version 5 draft for review was provided online for comment late 2023 and published in February 2025.

- NASA's instantiation of LunaNet is called Lunar Communication Relay and Navigation System (LCRNS).
- Moonlight Initiative is an ESA project intending to adopt the specifications.
- JAXA's instantiation of LunaNet is called Lunar Navigation Satellite System (LNSS)

== See also ==
- Deep Space Network, NASA spacecraft communications
- Artemis program, NASA's return to the Moon
- NovaMoon – European Lunar surface mission for satellite navigation on the Moon
- Laser communication in space
- Coordinated Lunar Time
