= HERACLES (spacecraft) =

Planned robotic lunar landing system by ESA and JAXA

Human-Enhanced Robotic Architecture and Capability for Lunar Exploration and Science (HERACLES)
- Designer: ESA / JAXA / CSA
- Operator: ESA / JAXA / CSA
- Applications: Lunar exploration, sample-return
- Website: Argonaut – European Large Logistics Lander

Specifications
- Spacecraft type: Robotic lander, rover, sample-return
- Launch mass: ≈8,500 kg (18,700 lb)
- Payload capacity: ≈1,500 kg (3,300 lb)

Production
- Status: Superseded by Argonaut

HERACLES (Human-Enhanced Robotic Architecture and Capability for Lunar Exploration and Science) was a proposed robotic transport system to and from the Moon by Europe (ESA), Japan (JAXA), and Canada (CSA) that would feature a lander called the European Large Logistic Lander (EL3, or Argonaut), a Lunar Ascent Element, and a rover. The lander could be configured for different operations such as up to 1.5 tons of cargo delivery, sample-returns, or prospecting resources found on the Moon. The system was planned to support the Artemis program and perform lunar exploration using the Lunar Gateway space station as a staging point. As of 2023, the HERACLES project has been superseded by the Argonaut project, and is no longer active.

== Project overview ==
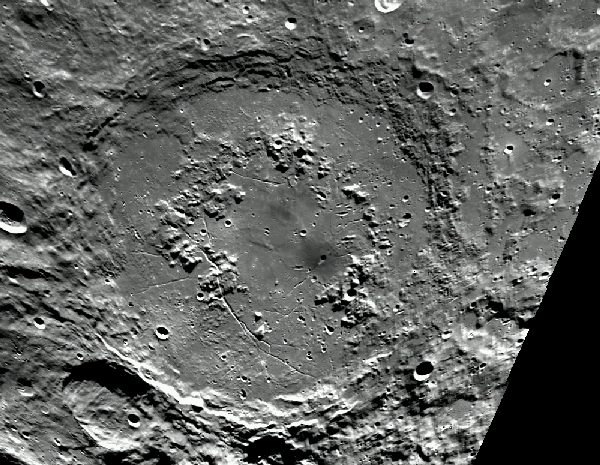
The first proposed landing site is within the Schrödinger crater, located near the south pole on the far side of the Moon.

The HERACLES architecture was outlined by 2015. ESA approved the HERACLES project in November 2019. Its first mission is expected to launch in 2030. The project will be the next phase of ESA's exploration program Terrae Novae (known as European Exploration Envelope Programme—E3P before 2021).

The HERACLES transport system would leverage the Lunar Gateway as a staging point. The architecture involved dispatching the EL3 lunar lander from Earth aboard an Ariane 64 which would land on the Moon with a disposable descent module.

The EL3 lander would have a landing mass of approximately 1,800 kg (4,000 lb) and would be capable of transporting a Canadian robotic rover to explore, prospect potential resources, and load samples up to 15 kg (33 lb) on the ascent module. The rover would then traverse several kilometers across the Schrödinger basin on the far side of the Moon to explore and collect more samples to load on the next EL3 lander. The ascent module would return each time to the Lunar Gateway, where it would be captured by the Canadian robotic arm and samples transferred to an Orion spacecraft for transport to Earth with the returning astronauts. The ascent module would then be refueled and paired with a new descent module dispatched from Earth.

The second and third landings would each have 500 kg (1,100 lb) payload available for alternate uses such as testing new hardware, demonstrating technology and gaining experience in operations. The 4th or 5th lander mission would provide a sample return.

The project would require the development of a reusable lunar ascent engine, four of which could be clustered to power a reusable crewed or robotic lander in the future. Later missions would include a pressurised rover driven by astronauts and an ascent module for the crew to return to Earth.

The key objectives of HERACLES included:

- Preparing for human lunar missions by implementing, demonstrating, and certifying technology elements for human lunar landing, surface operations, and return.
- Create opportunities for science, particularly sample return.
- Gain scientific and exploration knowledge, particularly on potential resources.
- Create opportunities to demonstrate and test technologies and operational procedures for future Mars missions.

== System elements ==
The HERACLES EL3 lander concept would consist of the Lunar Descent Element (LDE), which would be provided by Japan's JAXA, the ESA-built Interface Element that would house the rover, and the European Lunar Ascent Element (LAE) that would return the samples to the Lunar Gateway. The rover, to be developed by the Canadian Space Agency (CSA), would have a mass of 330 kg (730 lb) and would feature a "radioisotope power system" that would permit operations during the long and frigid lunar nights. The total spacecraft mass would be ≈8,500 kg (18,700 lb) including fuel, with a payload of ≈1,500 kg (3,300 lb).

HERACLES elements	Agency	Mass	Notes
Lunar Ascent Element (LAE)	ESA	110 kg (240 lb)	Launch samples from the Moon to the Lunar Gateway.
Interface Element	ESA	100 kg (220 lb)	Hosts rover and its deployment ramps
Lunar Descent Element (LDE)	JAXA		Powered soft landing of ≈1,500 kg payload, including all elements and rover.
Rover	CSA	330 kg (730 lb); Science instruments: ≈90 kg (200 lb)	Long-duration rover. Range: >100 km (62 mi)

== Reusable ascent engine development ==
Nammo have been awarded a contract to evaluate engine performance requirements and 'find' the best engine design. The engine may be fed by electrically driven pumps, from low pressure propellant tanks, which may enable in-space refueling.

== See also ==
- Argonaut — European lunar lander
- Artemis program – NASA-led lunar exploration program
- Commercial Lunar Payload Services – NASA program contracting commercial transportation services to the Moon
- Chandrayaan programme – Indian Lunar exploration programme
- Chinese Lunar Exploration Program – Lunar research program (2004–present)
- Luna-Glob – Moon exploration program by the Russian Federal Space Agency
