= Firefly Aerospace =

American aerospace company

Firefly Aerospace, Inc.
- Type: Public
- Traded as: Nasdaq: FLY
- Industry: Aerospace
- Founded: March 2017; 9 years ago
- Founder: Tom Markusic
- Headquarters: Cedar Park, Texas, United States
- Key people: Jason Kim (CEO); Ray Allensworth (Vice President of Spacecraft)
- Products: Alpha (small-lift launch vehicle); Eclipse (medium-lift launch vehicle); Blue Ghost (lunar lander); Elytra (space tug)
- Revenue: ▲US$160 million (2025)
- Net income: ▼ −US$298 million (2025)
- Total assets: US$1.63 billion (2026)
- Number of employees: 750 (2025)
- Website: fireflyspace.com

Firefly Aerospace, Inc. (Firefly) is an American aerospace firm based in Cedar Park, Texas. Firefly small- and medium-lift launch vehicles for commercial launches to orbit. Firefly's stated purpose is to increase access to space, similar to other private spaceflight companies.

The company was formed when the assets of the former company Firefly Space Systems were acquired by EOS Launcher in March 2017, which was then renamed Firefly Aerospace.

== History ==
=== Firefly Space Systems ===
==== Early growth ====
Firefly Space Systems began as a startup in January 2014 by Tom Markusic, P.J. King, Michael Blum, and a small group of entrepreneurs who self-funded the company. In November 2014, Firefly moved its headquarters from Hawthorne, California to Austin-suburb Cedar Park, Texas. It grew to 43 employees by November 2014, and purchased 215 acres (87 ha) of land for an engine test and manufacturing facility in Briggs, Texas, 50 miles (80 km) north of Austin.

In 2014, Firefly purchased fiber-winding equipment for manufacturing composite cryotanks that would be built using an out-of-autoclave process. Prototype tanks were tested at Marshall Space Flight Center of NASA in mid-2014.

The Firefly Alpha design was revealed in July 2014. Firefly's objective was to be cash-flow-positive by 2018, based on anticipated small-satellite business. Firefly had signed an agreement with Space Florida to launch from the Florida "Space Coast".

Firefly performed its first hot-fire engine test of the "Firefly Rocket Engine Research 1" (FRE-R1) on September 10, 2015. The initial demonstration launch of the Firefly Alpha was planned to be as early as 2016.

==== Litigation and closure ====
In December 2014, Tom Markusic's former employer Virgin Galactic alleged he had illegally provided Virgin intellectual property to the Alpha development team. Virgin also alleged that Markusic had "destroyed storage devices, disposed of computers, and reformatted hard drives to cover the tracks of his misappropriation of Virgin Galactic information". In August 2016, an independent arbitrator confirmed that Markusic had destroyed evidence. Thereafter, a major European investor backed down, leaving Firefly without sufficient money to proceed. The company furloughed its entire staff in October 2016. According to Markusic, the investor's drawback was not related to the litigation but to Brexit. Within the same month, Virgin Orbit filed suit in Los Angeles County Superior Court against Firefly and two of its officers. By December 1, 2016, Firefly Space Systems had permanently ceased engineering work.

In March 2017, it was announced that "virtually all" of the assets of Firefly would be sold at auction, organized by EOS Launcher, Inc., who had previously bought a US$1 million promissory note issued by Firefly to Space Florida and induced a foreclosure.

=== Firefly Aerospace ===
After going bankrupt and being liquidated in March 2017, the company was re-created as Firefly Aerospace by Noosphere Ventures, who bought out the assets of former Firefly Space Systems. The owner of Noosphere Ventures, Max Polyakov, committed to fully fund Firefly through at least its first two launches. The plans for engine development were significantly altered by the new management, and the revised Alpha vehicle design featured a pump-fed engine and removed the aerospike configuration. The reorganization initially delayed development by approximately a year, with the first launch expected, as of 2017, in 2019.

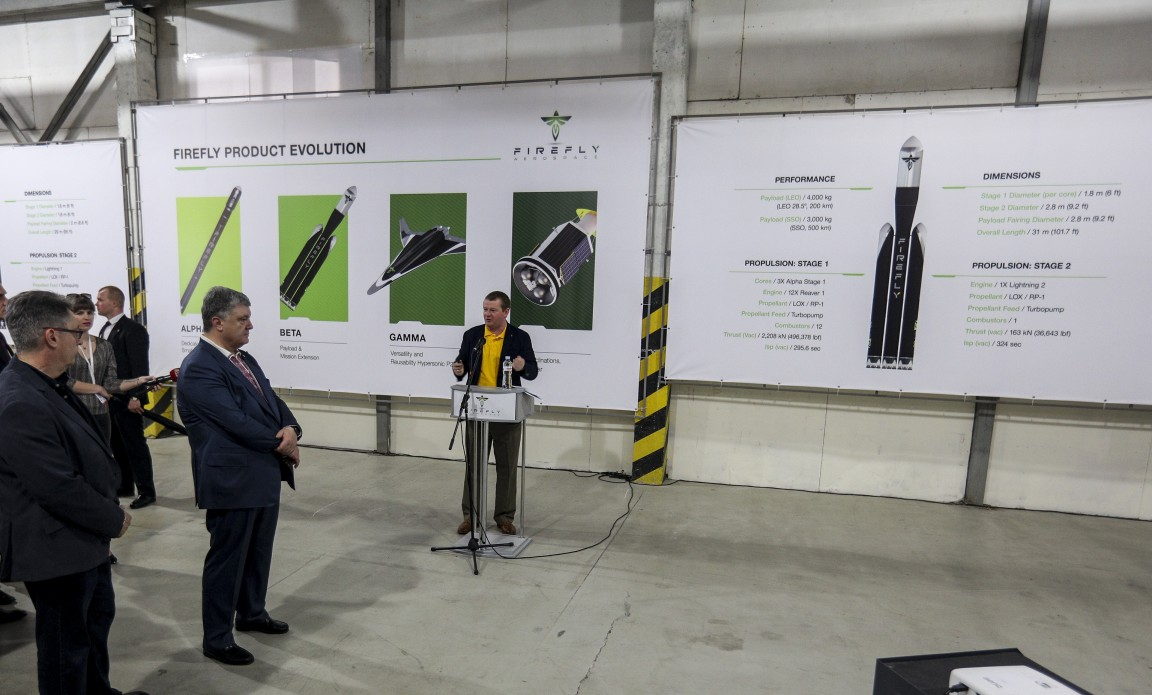
President of Ukraine, Petro Poroshenko, at the opening of a Ukrainian branch

On May 17, 2018, Firefly Aerospace opened a research and development (R&D) center in the city of Dnipro, Ukraine. The Firefly R&D center was announced to become, over time, a place of work for more than 150 employees, and is equipped with the largest 3D-printer in Ukraine, intended for industrial manufacturing of high-quality metal parts.

On October 10, 2018, Firefly Aerospace and smallsat developer York Space Systems announced a partnership to offer customers a combined package of satellite and launch services.

In November 2018, it was announced that NASA selected Firefly Aerospace as one of nine companies able to bid for Commercial Lunar Payload Services (CLPS), where the company would propose a robotic lunar lander called Firefly Genesis.

In February 2019, the company announced that it would develop manufacturing facilities and a launch site at Cape Canaveral. They have leased a private launch pad in Florida – the former Space Launch Complex 20 (SLC-20) which had been used by the US Air Force in the 1950s through 1996 – from the US government and they also have a similar lease arrangement on the US West Coast.

In December 2019, a group of primary shareholders of Firefly Space Systems filed a lawsuit alleging fraud and intentional bankruptcy of the company by Tom Markusic. According to the defendants, including Polyakov, the lawsuit was provocative and the plaintiffs' claims unfounded, three years after the updated Firefly Aerospace was a significant success. The lawsuit is pending.

In February 2021, NASA awarded approximately US$93.3 million to Firefly Aerospace to develop exploration technologies for Artemis Commercial Moon Delivery in 2023.

The company completed its $75 million Series A investment round in May 2021, which was led by DADA Holdings.

Firefly launched its first test flight on September 3, 2021. The Firefly Alpha rocket experienced an anomaly during ascent, and the Range terminated the flight using the explosive Flight Termination System (FTS).

In late November 2021, Maxim Polyakov received a letter from the Committee on Foreign Investment in the United States (CFIUS) asking Polyakov and his investment firm Noosphere Venture Partners to sell a stake in Firefly (nearly 50%) for national security reasons. Polyakov denied the threat to US national security, but agreed to comply. Noosphere Ventures has announced that it will hire an investment banking firm to sell. Even before the start of the 2022 Russian invasion of Ukraine, the future of the Firefly R&D center in Ukraine was uncertain; after the invasion started, the Dnipro factory was bombed, and many of the Ukrainian engineers either joined the army or fled the country.

The government did not provide reasons beyond Polyakov being an ethnic Ukrainian, while Ukraine and Russia had once worked together on rockets. Despite Polyakov's anger, he agreed, and on February 24, 2022, it was announced that Polyakov and his company Noosphere would sell their stake in Firefly to AE Industrial Partners.

In August 2022, Northrop Grumman announced that it had contracted Firefly Aerospace to build the Antares rocket's new 300-series' first stage, which is similar to Firefly's in-development MLV launch vehicle, and features the same composite structures as well as seven Miranda engines producing 7,200 kN (1,600,000 lbf) of thrust – substantially greater than the previous 200-series first stage. Northrop Grumman states that the new first stage substantially increases the mass capability of Antares.

On October 1, 2022, Firefly launched the Alpha rocket on its second test flight "To the Black" from Space Launch Complex 2 from Vandenberg Space Force Base. Alpha completed all objectives (that Firefly had itself placed) for the mission, becoming the first orbital rocket to be powered by a tap-off cycle engine. The mission was the first partially successful orbital launch for Alpha, carrying educational payloads. Alpha deployed 7 satellites, however, due to the lower than intended final deployment orbit, most of the satellites re-entered approximately a week after launch.

On September 14, 2023, Firefly successfully launched the Alpha rocket on its first mission for the United States Department of Defense, placing a spacecraft for Millennium Space into orbit and demonstrating a rapid response launch for the United States Armed Forces.

In 2024, it was announced that Firefly would compete with companies like Rocket Lab and SpaceX for small satellite launch contracts with the United States Department of Defense.

In July 2024, CEO Bill Weber resigned amid reports that the company was investigating an alleged inappropriate relationship. Peter Schumacher, a board member, served as interim CEO while the company searched for a new CEO. On August 29, 2024, it was announced that the next CEO would be Jason Kim, who served in the role at Millennium Space.

In July 2025, Firefly secured a $176.7 million NASA CLPS contract for a south-pole lunar mission planned in 2029. The mission will deliver two rovers (CMU MoonRanger and CSA Rover) and three science instruments using the Blue Ghost lander and Elytra Dark relay satellite.

Firefly went public through an initial public offering on the Nasdaq under the ticker symbol "FLY" in August 2025. The company raised $868 million in the offering and was valued at approximately $10 billion.

== Launch vehicles ==
=== Firefly Alpha ===
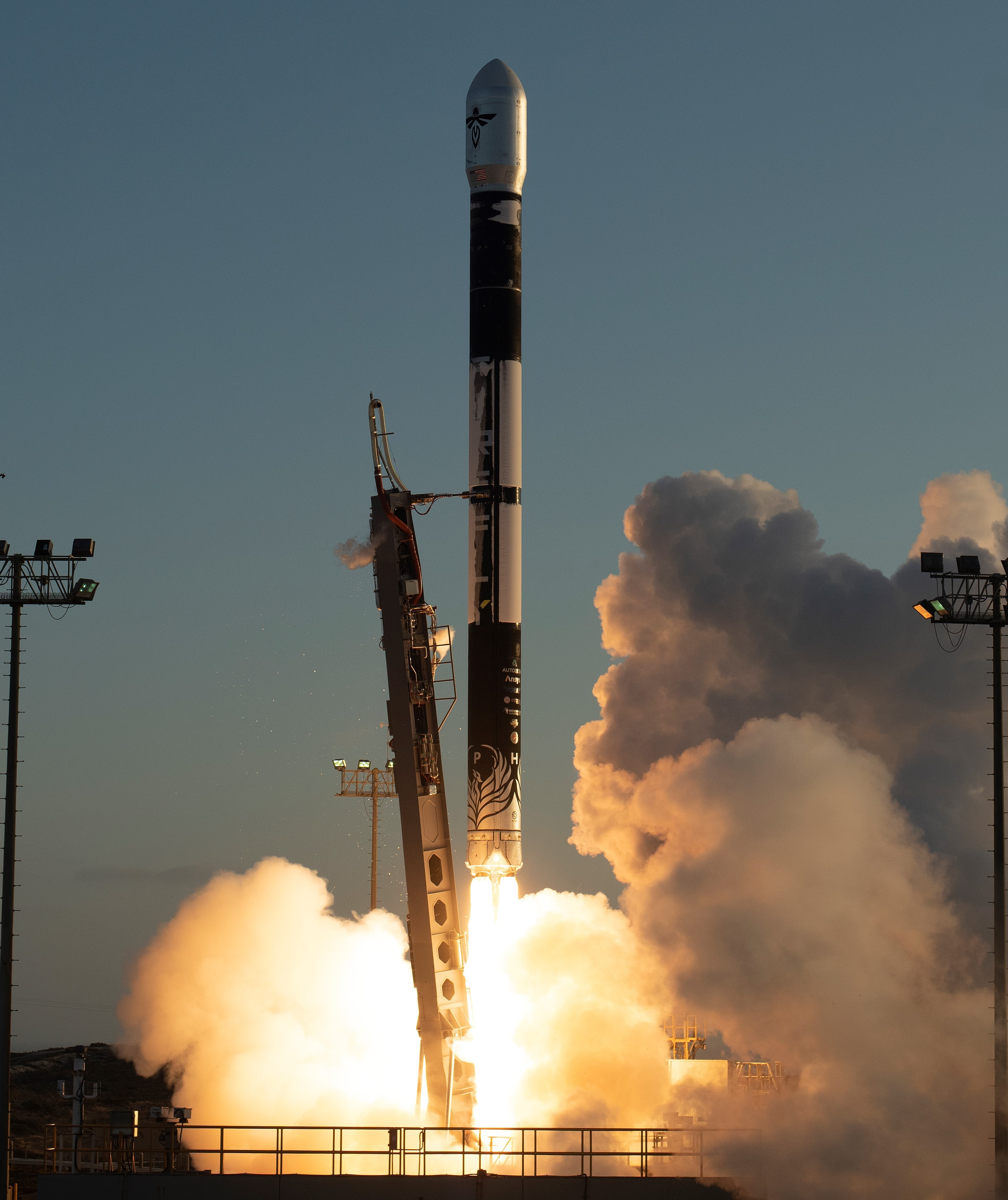
Firefly Alpha lifting off the pad at Vandenberg Space Force Base on September 2, 2021

The Alpha vehicle developed by Firefly Aerospace is an expendable launch vehicle capable of lifting 1,030 kg (2,270 lb) to low Earth orbit and 630 kg (1,390 lb) to Sun-synchronous orbit. Firefly's advertised launch price is US$15 million. Alpha is designed to compete with vehicles like Rocket Lab's Electron, ISRO's SSLV, ABL SS's RS1, and Northrop Grumman's Pegasus. It utilizes four Reaver engines on its first stage and one Lightning engine on its second, with a lightweight carbon composite structure to minimize dry mass, thereby increasing the payload fraction.

Alpha performed its first partially successful orbital launch on October 1, 2022, after an unsuccessful first attempt on September 3, 2021. The first fully successful launch of Alpha took place on September 15, 2023. Firefly launched this mission 27 hours after receiving notice to launch, setting a new record for the fastest national security mission-responsive launch. The previous responsive-launch record was 21 days in June 2021. Firefly's fourth launch on December 22, 2023, was also partially successful, with the second stage failing to perform its circularization burn, leaving its payload in an elliptical orbit instead.

On September 29, 2025, an Alpha rocket, scheduled for its seventh flight, experienced a first-stage explosion during a pre-flight test in Texas. The company stated that all safety protocols were followed, no personnel were injured, and potential impacts to the test platform were being assessed. This incident will delay the rocket's next launch.

Launch	Success/Failure	Date
FLTA001	Fail	9/2021
FLTA002	Success	10/2022
FLTA003	Success	9/2023
FLTA004	Fail	12/2023
FLTA005	Success	7/2024
FLTA006	Fail	4/2025
FLTA007	Success	3/2026

=== Eclipse ===
==== Previous designs ====
Firefly previously pursued a medium-lift launch vehicle design known as Firefly Beta, which consisted of three Alpha cores strapped together. In October 2019, Firefly announced a partnership with Aerojet Rocketdyne to develop a single-core rocket potentially powered by the Aerojet Rocketdyne AR1 engine. In 2020, the Beta was redesigned to be a scaled-up Alpha. The first stage would be 3.7 m (12 ft) in diameter with 5 Reaver 2 engines capable of delivering 8000 kg to LEO or 5800 kg to SSO inside a 4.7 m (15 ft) fairing. In October 2021, the first Beta launch was planned for the second half of 2024.

==== Current design ====
Since its announcement in August 2022, the MLV design has undergone several revisions. Renamed to the Medium Launch Vehicle, or MLV, the rocket is now 4.32 m (14.17 ft) in diameter with 7 Miranda engines on the first stage and 1 Vira engine on the second stage. It will be capable of delivering over 16,000 kg to LEO in a 5 m (16.4 ft) fairing. MLV will initially be expendable but will eventually "incorporate first-stage reusability." In April 2024, the company reported on social media that it was progressing and on track with Miranda engine testing for the MLV. In mid-2024, the company announced that the MLV's first stage is being designed as a reusable launch vehicle, with the intention of refining the technology by the sixth flight of the vehicle. In May 2025, Firefly and Northrop Grumman announced that MLV would get renamed to Eclipse. As of March 2026, the first flight of Eclipse is expected to take place in 2027.

=== Antares 300 ===
Firefly is a subcontractor for the Northrop Grumman Antares series 300, providing the first stage, which consists of a de-rated Eclipse first stage. The second stage is carried over from the previous Antares 230+. Wallops LP-0A is being retrofitted to support the new, larger, more powerful first stage. In April 2024, the company announced testing was occurring on the Antares 300.

=== Firefly Gamma ===
Firefly FRE-R1 engine test, September 2015

Firefly Gamma was a concept of a winged rocket to launch small payloads into orbit. It would have been a two-stage-to-orbit partially reusable rocket, with its first stage landing horizontally on a runway.

== Lunar landers ==
=== Blue Ghost ===
Blue Ghost is a class of lunar landers designed at Firefly's Cedar Park facility to meet the updated NASA requirements for a Commercial Lunar Payload Services (CLPS) lunar lander. The lander is named after the blue ghost firefly Phausis reticulata.

On January 15, 2025, Blue Ghost M1, the first Firefly lander, launched on a Falcon 9 Block 5 launch vehicle, and it landed successfully on the Moon on March 2, 2025. The launch was shared with the competing Hakuto-R Mission 2 lunar lander, which failed.

On March 2, 2025, Blue Ghost performed a "picture-perfect landing," making Firefly the first commercial company in history to achieve a successful soft-landing on the Moon.

=== Genesis (defunct) ===
On June 9, 2019, Firefly Aerospace announced that it had signed an agreement with Israel Aerospace Industries (IAI), which owns the intellectual property of the Beresheet lunar lander design, to build a lunar lander named Genesis based on Beresheet. Genesis was proposed for NASA's Commercial Lunar Payload Services (CLPS) to deliver payloads to the Moon's surface. If selected, Firefly Genesis would have been launched on a Firefly Beta rocket or a Falcon 9 rocket in late 2022. Due to changes in CLPS specifications, Firefly determined that Genesis no longer met NASA's requirements and began work on the Blue Ghost in 2021.

== Engines ==
To date, Firefly is the only organization to develop an orbital-class rocket engine using the combustion tap-off cycle, and the only organization to develop a tap-off cycle engine using RP-1 (highly refined kerosene) and liquid oxygen propellants. This engine type eliminates gas generators and instead opts to "tap off" the main combustion chamber, using the heat and pressure within it to drive the pumps. Other engines utilizing the tap-off cycle include the Rocketdyne J-2S and Blue Origin BE-3PM, both of which are hydrolox engines (fueled by liquid hydrogen).

=== Reaver ===
Reaver is an expendable rocket engine designed for use on Firefly's Alpha rocket. It produces 184 kilonewtons (41,000 lb_{f}) of thrust and a specific impulse of 295.6 seconds (2.899 km/s). It is powered by RP-1 and liquid oxygen as its fuel and oxidizer, respectively. Reaver is fixed-throttle, meaning it runs at full power from ignition to first stage shutdown (eschewing the typical throttle-down performed by many vehicles at Max-Q to reduce aerodynamic loads) and is ignited with the pyrophoric combination TEA-TEB (also used on the SpaceX Merlin and Rocketdyne F-1). It uses a pintle-type injector.

In 2021, The Verge reported that Astra Space had purchased up to 50 modified Reaver engines and a technology transfer to license-build their own version of Reaver in-house for their Rocket 4 vehicle. Astra refers to this engine as Chiron. It is largely the same as Reaver, but Firefly implemented a two-axis hydraulic gimbal and a modified startup sequence to meet Astra's demands, as part of Firefly's space propulsion program.

=== Lightning ===
Lightning is a vacuum-optimized engine designed for use on the upper stage of Firefly's Alpha rocket. Lightning produces 70.1 kilonewtons (15,800 lb_{f}) of thrust and a specific impulse of 322 seconds (3.16 km/s). Like Reaver, Lightning uses RP-1 and LOX as its propellants, as well as the same combustion tap-off cycle. It is also relightable for missions requiring multiple upper-stage burns. It uses Firefly's patented "Crossfire" injector design.

=== Miranda ===
Miranda is a liquid-propellant rocket engine currently being developed to power the company's Eclipse orbital launch vehicle. Miranda will also be used on the Antares 330 rocket developed by Northrop Grumman.

The Antares previously used a Ukrainian-built first stage with the Russian-built RD-181 engine; however, its production ceased after the 2022 Russian invasion of Ukraine. Firefly will also assemble the entire first stage for the Antares 330.

Like Firefly's previous engines, the Miranda will use RP-1 and LOX in a combustion tap-off cycle. It is expected to produce 1,023 kilonewtons (230,000 lb_{f}) of thrust and a specific impulse of 305 seconds (2.99 km/s) in vacuum.

Development began in 2022, and in 2024, Firefly reported substantial progress on testing the engine, with 20 test fires completed. As of June 2024, the Miranda engine had entered production. To support production of the Miranda engine, the MLV, and the first-stage for the Antares 300, Firefly expanded its Briggs, Texas, facility from 92,000 to 207,000 square feet (8,500 to 19,200 m^{2}).

Firefly said that it has designed Miranda from its inception for reusability. The company plans to restart the engine multiple times as the rocket performs a return-to-launch-site maneuver for a propulsive landing.

=== Vira ===
Vira (formerly known as "Miranda Vacuum," "Viranda," and "Lightning 2") is a vacuum-optimized version of Miranda designed for the upper stage of Firefly's MLV vehicle. Like the Miranda, the engine will be fueled by RP-1 and LOX. It is expected to produce 890 kilonewtons (200,000 lb_{f}) of thrust and a specific impulse of 328 seconds (3.22 km/s) in vacuum. It is relightable for missions requiring multiple upper stage burns.

== Elytra ==
Firefly has been developing Elytra, a lineup of orbital transfer vehicles designed to move payloads and satellites from one orbit to another within LEO, GEO, and cislunar space. Elytra would enable smaller rockets (such as Firefly's own Alpha) to deliver larger payloads to more challenging orbits, and facilitate satellite relocation, servicing, mission extension, and deorbiting.

Elytra is planned to be produced in three versions: Elytra Dawn (the smallest, intended for LEO operations), Elytra Dusk (intended for LEO-to-geostationary transfers), and Elytra Dark (the most capable, intended for long-duration transfers to cislunar space and beyond). Elytra Dark will propel Blue Ghost Mission 2 to lunar orbit and serve as an orbiter, as well as deploy ESA's Lunar Pathfinder payload.

In March 2025, the Defense Innovation Unit awarded Firefly a contract to use three to six Elytra Dawn vehicles as part of its "Sinequone" project.

== Production ==
Firefly headquarters and factory are located in Cedar Park, Texas. The company has access to approximately 50,000 ft^{2} (4,600 m^{2}) of manufacturing facilities for building composite and metallic components in-house. Firefly will use leased launch sites in California (Vandenberg Space Launch Complex 2) and in Florida (SLC-20).

== See also ==
- Relativity Space
- Rocket Lab
- Stoke Space
