= Commercial Lunar Mission Support Services =

NASA program supporting commercial lunar missions.

The Commercial Lunar Mission Support Services (CLMSS), also called Lunar Mission Support Services (LMSS) is a collaboration between Surrey Satellite Technology Ltd (SSTL) and the European Space Agency (ESA) to develop lunar telecommunications and navigation infrastructure to support lunar scientific and economic development.

The collaboration agreement, announced on 17 April 2018, proposes a step-wise approach to implementing a sustainable commercial service to support both orbiting and landed lunar assets.

== Overview ==
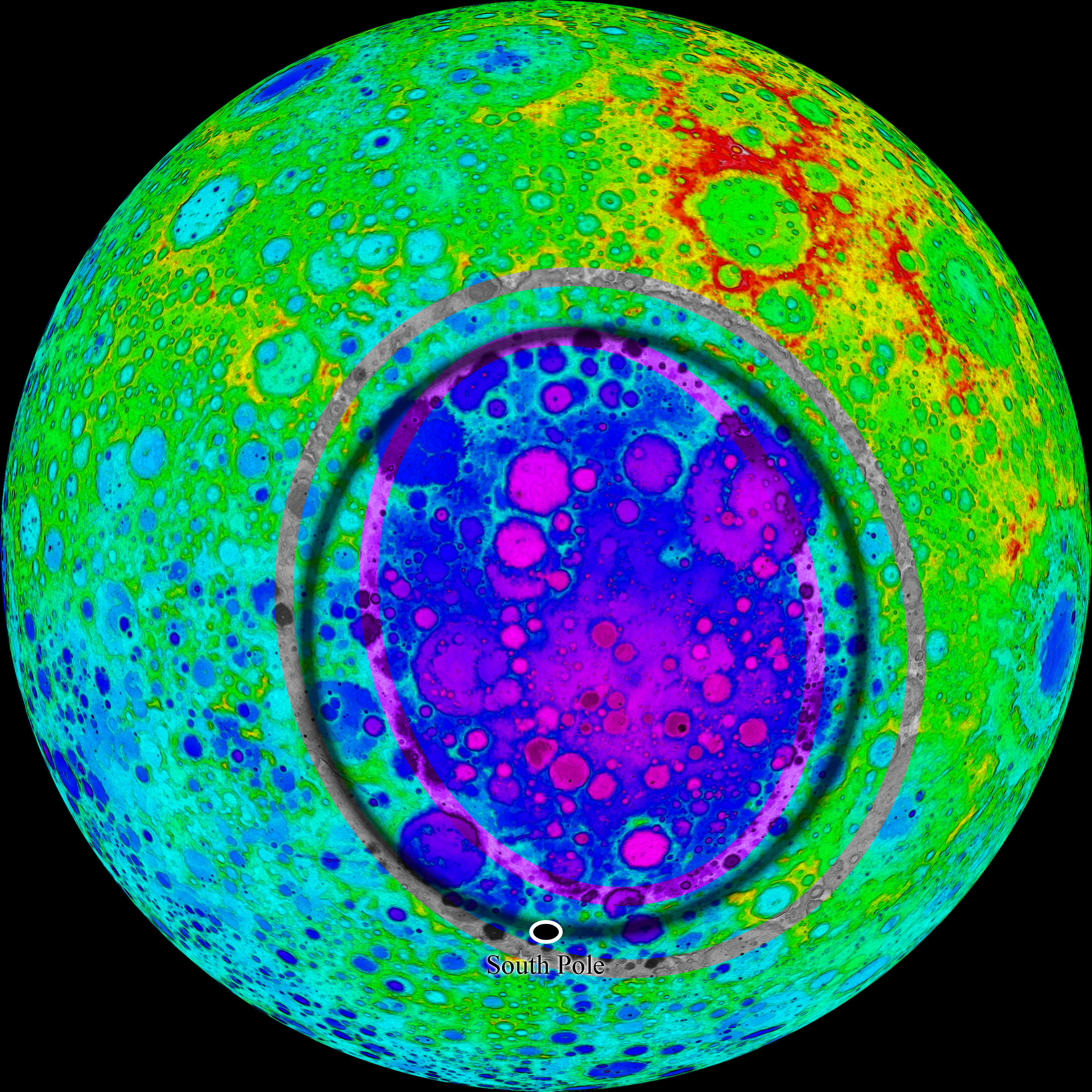
Topographic map of the South Pole–Aitken basin based on Kaguya orbiter data. Red represents high elevation, purple represents low elevation. The purple and grey elliptical rings trace the inner and outer walls of the basin.

Dozens of different commercial, private and public missions to the Moon are planned for the coming decades, so the Commercial Lunar Mission Support Services (CLMSS) project intends to provide a sustainable communications and navigation infrastructure. While the signed agreement covers missions to the Moon, there is the potential to apply a similar service for Mars in the future.

ESA will be the anchor customer for services from Lunar Pathfinder, a dedicated lunar communications relay spacecraft and a precursor to the Moonlight Initiative constellation, launching in 2026.

=== Lunar Pathfinder ===
SSTL Lunar, the Lunar Pathfinder service provider, aims to offer lunar communications for commercial and institutional customers in support of prospecting, exploring, and ultimately utilising the far side of the Moon. Lunar Pathfinder's communications relay service will be a mission enabler, providing a vital bridge between Earth and the lunar surface. Exploring the far side of the Moon, particularly the South Pole Aitkin Basin, is a key area for future robotic and human exploration due to its chemical and mineral composition. The stable elliptical orbit of Lunar Pathfinder will allow for long duration visibility of the Southern Lunar Hemisphere each day, with maximum opportunities for the transmission and reception of data between Earth and the lunar surface.

As well as offering communication services to orbiters and lunar surface assets, Lunar Pathfinder will also host some navigation and science experiments:

- An ESA GNSS receiver capable of detecting weak signals coming from the Earth GNSS infrastructure (GPS and Galileo), demonstrating its potential role into Lunar navigation,
- A NASA retro-reflector to demonstrate laser ranging capabilities and support the evaluation of the GNSS receiver,
- An ESA radiation monitor to collect orbital radiation data and form part of ESA's Space Weather monitoring network.

Some of SSTL's key technology development needed for the mission have been supported by the UK Space Agency through ESA.

For surface assets on the far side of the Moon, which are without of line of sight to the Earth, data relay services are essential to communicate "back to base". For polar surface assets, potentially with limited direct to Earth visibility, the use of the data-relay service provides the assurance of a communication link, whenever the terrain blocks direct communication. Rovers, constrained to remain within line of sight of the lander to relay their data, will find a new independence, both in how far they can travel from the lander and how long they can survive beyond the lander's limited lifetime.

For all lunar missions, including orbiters and near side surface assets which could manage with direct to Earth communication (DTE), there is an additional economical and technical benefit to using the proximity data-relay service. Due to the proximity of the Lunar Pathfinder spacecraft, user assets could achieve higher data-rates with a simpler, lighter and lower cost communication module on-board, compared with the equipment needed for DTE communication.

== See also ==
- Commercial Lunar Payload Services, a NASA project to send small payloads to the Moon
