= Moonlight Programme =

Project by the European Space Agency

Moonlight
- Country of origin: European Space Agency
- Applications: Lunar communication and navigation

Production
- Planned: 5
- Launched: 0
- Maiden launch: 2028 (planned)

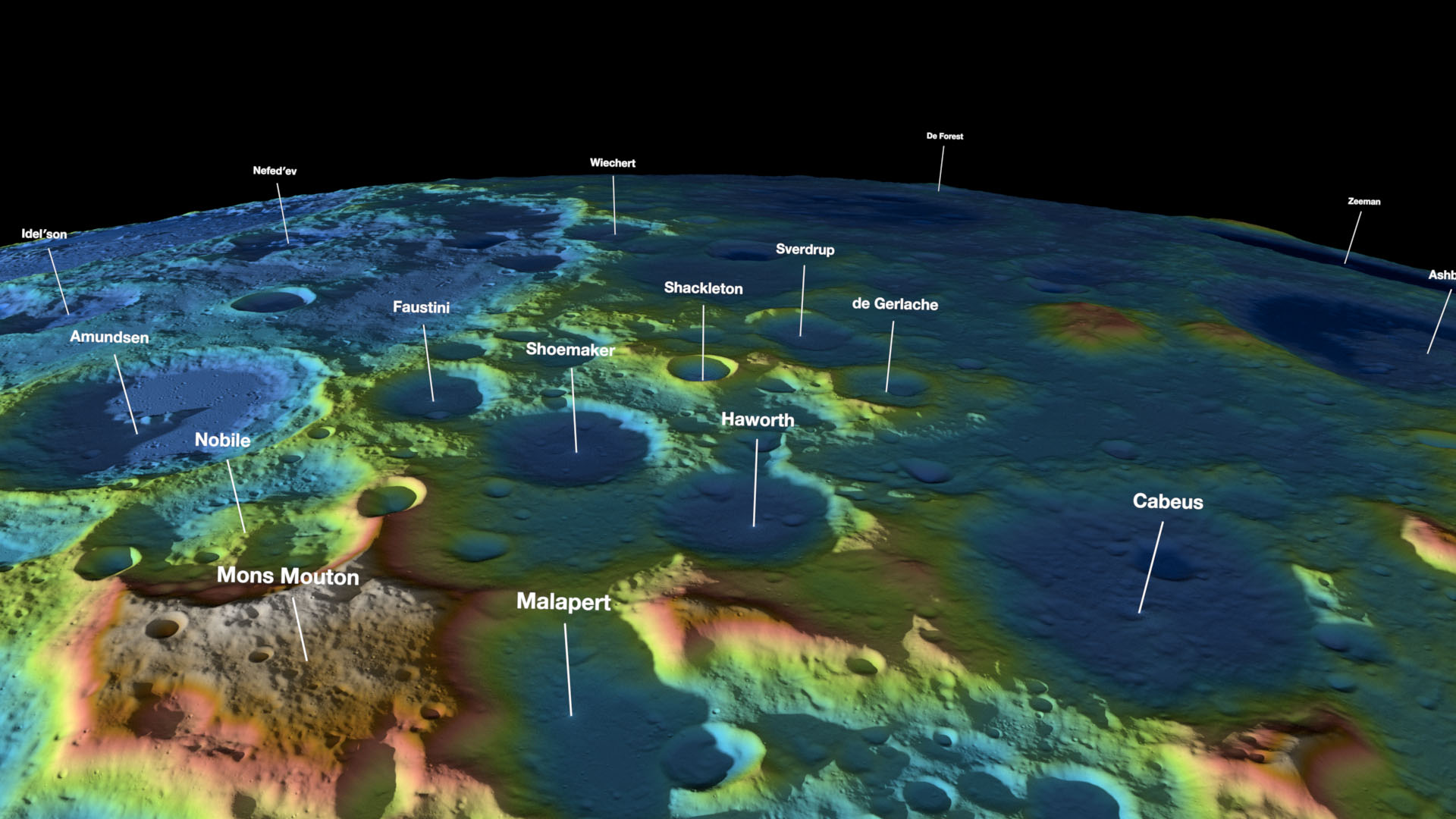
Lunar south pole terrain

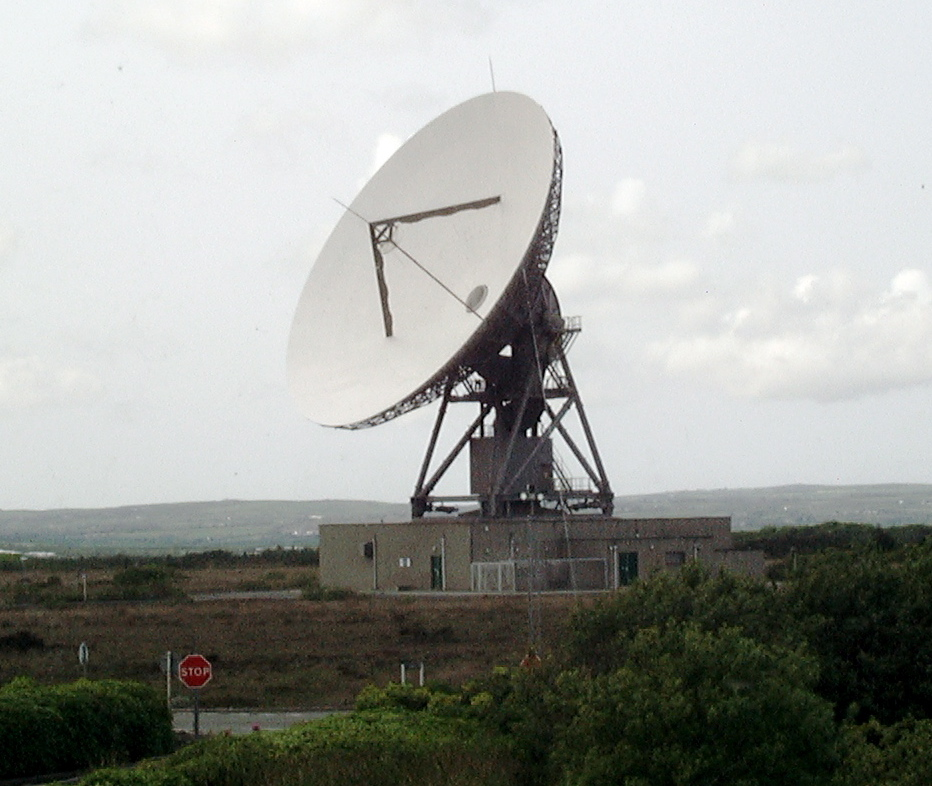
Goonhilly Satellite Earth Station

The Moonlight programme or the Moonlight Lunar Communications and Navigation Services (LCNS) is an initiative by the European Space Agency (ESA) with the goal of creating uninterrupted telecommunications satellite coverage between Earth and the Moon, as well as lunar satellite navigation with precision of up to three metres, facilitating future lunar projects.

== Background ==
LCNS is a partnership between ESA and an industry consortium led by Telespazio, with support from the UK Space Agency and the Italian Space Agency. Moonlight is managed by ESA Connectivity and Secure Communications (CSC) directorate, alongside the ARTES and IRIS^{2} programmes.

== Goals ==
The stated end goal of the Moonlight programme is to make it easier for institution and companies to build infrastructure (i.e. mining, utilities, power, etc.) on the Moon, culminating in a sustained long-term human presence. LCNS is intended for enhancing efficiency and reducing costs of lunar operations. ESA intends to work in partnership with NASA and JAXA in creating lasting telecommunications and navigation links with the moon, involving the adoption of the LunaNet specifications.

== Spacecraft ==
The communications relay satellite Lunar Pathfinder, set for launch in 2027, will serve as a precursor to the full LCNS constellation. The complete constellation will consist of five lunar orbiters between 400 and 600 kg per satellite, launched in two separate stages. One satellite will be focused on communications ("COMSAT") and four on navigation ("NAVSAT-1" to "NAVSAT-4").

The orbits of the LCNS satellites will be designed to prioritise coverage of the lunar south pole area. The COMSAT satellite will have an orbital period of 12 hours and a semi-major axis of about 6,000 km. The NAVSAT satellites will have an orbital period of 24 hours and a semi-major axis of about 10,000 km. All LCNS satellites will be placed on Elliptical Lunar Frozen Orbits (ELFOs) in order to keep a constant eccentricity, inclination, and argument of pericenter.

== History ==
In April 2018, ESA has signed a collaboration agreement with Surrey Satellite Technology Ltd (SSTL) and Goonhilly Earth Station (GES) for Commercial Lunar Mission Support Services (CLMSS). The agreement includes collaboration on the Lunar Pathfinder mission. In July 2020, ESA announced a call to companies for expressions of interest to contribute to commercial satellite services for the Moon. In May 2021, the Moonlight Initiative was officially announced. In February 2023, ESA expressed interest in creating international lunar timekeeping standards and stressed their importance for LCNS and similar projects. In June 2023, The first satnav receiver designed to operate in lunar orbit has been delivered to SSTL in the UK for integration aboard the Lunar Pathfinder spacecraft. In October 2023, ESA launched "a competition for visionary business ideas" for how to use LCNS, and expects to offer contracts to develop such ideas.

In November 2024, ESA officially commenced the LCNS programme at the International Astronautical Congress in Milan. At this event, ESA signed a contract worth 123 million euro with Telespazio to manage the development of LCNS. In March 2025, Telespazio has awarded a contract to Thales Alenia Space to build the four satellites and to develop elements of the system’s ground segment. ESA and JAXA have signed a statement of intent detailing future cooperation within the LunaNet framework. ESA has also selected Viasat to lead the lunar orbiting satellite communications portion of LCNS, alongside Telespazio. Viasat will design and develop the end-end service, covering the satellites, ground segments, and user terminals. In July 2025, two UK companies—SSTL and MDA Space UK—joined the Moonlight initiative to work with Viasat. In September 2025, Telespazio and ispace signed a letter of intent to start collaborating on LCNS, possibly by using the ispace's flight-tested technology to transport the LCNS satellites into lunar orbit. In November 2025, ESA member states confirmed funding of €176 million for Moonlight for the next three years.

== See also ==
- List of European Space Agency programmes and missions
- Argonaut lunar lander
- Lunar Link
- Coordinated Lunar Time
