= Timekeeping on the Moon =

Timekeeping on the Moon is an issue of synchronized human activity on the Moon and contact with such. The two main differences to timekeeping on Earth are the length of a day on the Moon, being the lunar day or lunar month, observable from Earth as the lunar phases, and the rate at which time progresses, with 24 hours on the Moon being 58.7 microseconds (0.0000587 seconds) faster, resulting from gravitational time dilation due to the different masses of the Moon and Earth.

== History ==
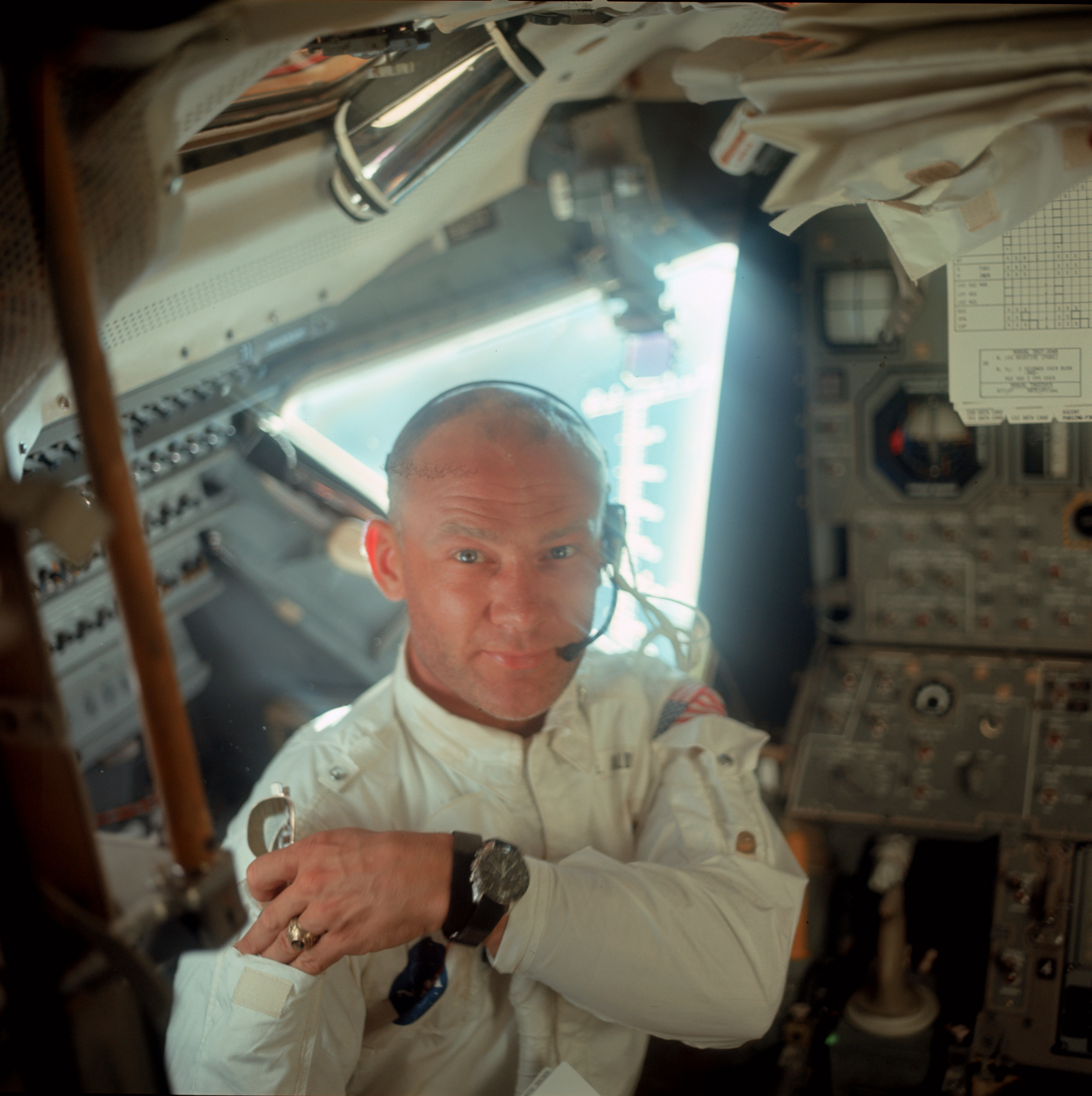
Buzz Aldrin wearing an Omega Speedmaster watch during Apollo 11 mission in 1969

Harrison Schmitt and Eugene Cernan sing "The Fountain in the Park" during an Apollo 17 moonwalk, Schmitt substituting 'December' for the original 'May'

The technology used for the timekeeping devices deployed to the Moon have varied over the decades. Several Omega Speedmasters have been on the Moon, synched to Central Standard Time (CST).

The Apollo Guidance Computer (AGC) kept a triple-precision count of time in a real time clock cuing from a quartz oscillator; a standby option (although never used) would allow it to update this count every 1.28 second (~0.78 hertz) — more often when not standing by. In addition to maintaining the clock cycle, computer timekeeping allowed the AGC to display the capsule's vertical and horizontal movements relative to the Moon's surface, in units of feet per second.

== Coordinated Lunar Time ==
Coordinated Lunar Time (LTC) is a proposed primary lunar time standard for the Moon. In early April 2024, the White House asked NASA to work alongside US and international agencies for the purpose of establishing a unified standard time for the Moon and other celestial bodies by 2026. The White House's request, led by the Office of Science and Technology Policy (OSTP), called for a "Coordinated Lunar Time", which was first proposed by the European Space Agency in early 2023.

There is no lunar time standard. As a result, activities on the Moon are coordinated using the time zone of where a mission's headquarters is based. For example, the Apollo missions utilized the Central Time Zone as the missions were controlled from Houston, Texas. Likewise, Chinese activities on the Moon run on China Standard Time. As more countries are active on the Moon and interact with each other, a different, unified system will be needed.

With renewed international interest in human travel to the moon, reminiscent of the space race, especially in the United States and China, a need exists for a universal time-keeping benchmark so that lunar spacecraft and satellites are able to fulfill their respective missions with precision and accuracy. Due to differences in gravitational force and other factors, time passes fractionally faster on the Moon when observed from Earth.

Under the Artemis program, and supported by the Commercial Lunar Payload Services missions, astronauts and a proposed scientific moonbase are envisioned to take place on and around the lunar surface from the 2020s onwards. The proposed standard would therefore solve a timekeeping issue. According to OSTP Chief Arati Prabhakar, time would "appear to lose on average 58.7 microseconds per Earth-day and come with other periodic variations that would further drift Moon time from Earth time".

The development of the standard is set to be a collaborative effort, initially amongst members of the Artemis Accords, but will be meant to apply globally. The initial proposal of the standard calls for four key features:

- traceability back to Coordinated Universal Time,
- accuracy sufficient for navigation and science,
- resilience to disruptions, and
- scalability to potential environments beyond cislunar space.

LunaNet, an upcoming lunar communications and navigation service under development with the European Space Agency, calls for a Lunar Time System Standard which the LTC is meant to address.

In August 2024, the US National Institute of Standards and Technology furthered development of the proposal by releasing a draft for the standard focused on defining the framework and mathematical model. The draft takes into account the gravitational differences on the Moon and was published to The Astronomical Journal.

In December 2025, researchers at the Purple Mountain Observatory in Nanjing, China, released a program that can calculate LTC. Their program is accurate to about 0.15 nanoseconds, up to the Earth's year 2050.

== See also ==
- International Celestial Reference System and its realizations – Current standard celestial reference system and frame
- Lunar calendar – Calendar based only on the Moon
- Month – Unit of time, usually 28 to 31 days
- Nautical time – System that allows ships on sea to express their local time
- Selenoid – Lunar geoid
- Sidereal time – Timekeeping system on Earth relative to the celestial sphere
- Timekeeping on Mars – Proposed approaches to tracking date and time on the planet Mars
