= Sverdrup (crater) =

Lunar impact crater

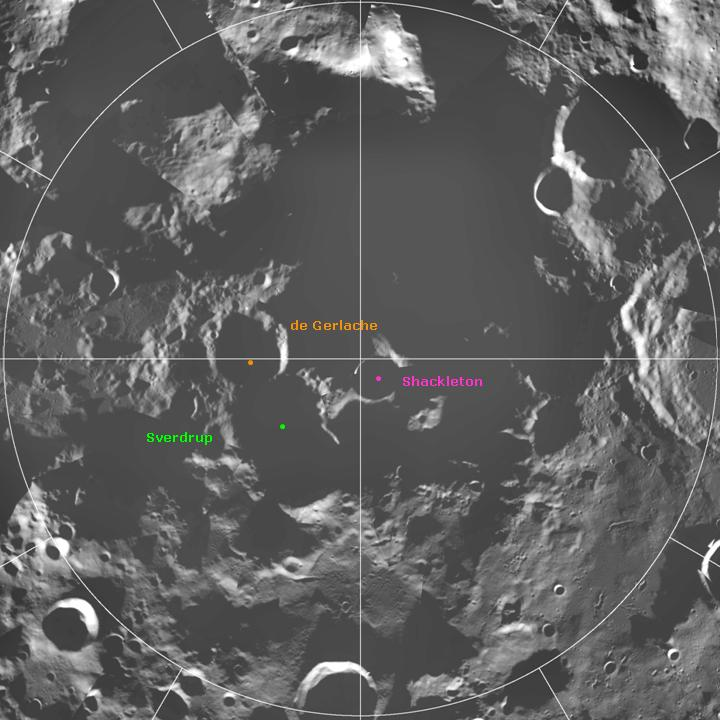
- Sverdrup Crater as imaged by Clementine.
- Coordinates: 88.5°S 152.0°W
- Diameter: 35 km
- Depth: Unknown
- Colongitude: 170° at sunrise
- Eponym: Otto N. Sverdrup

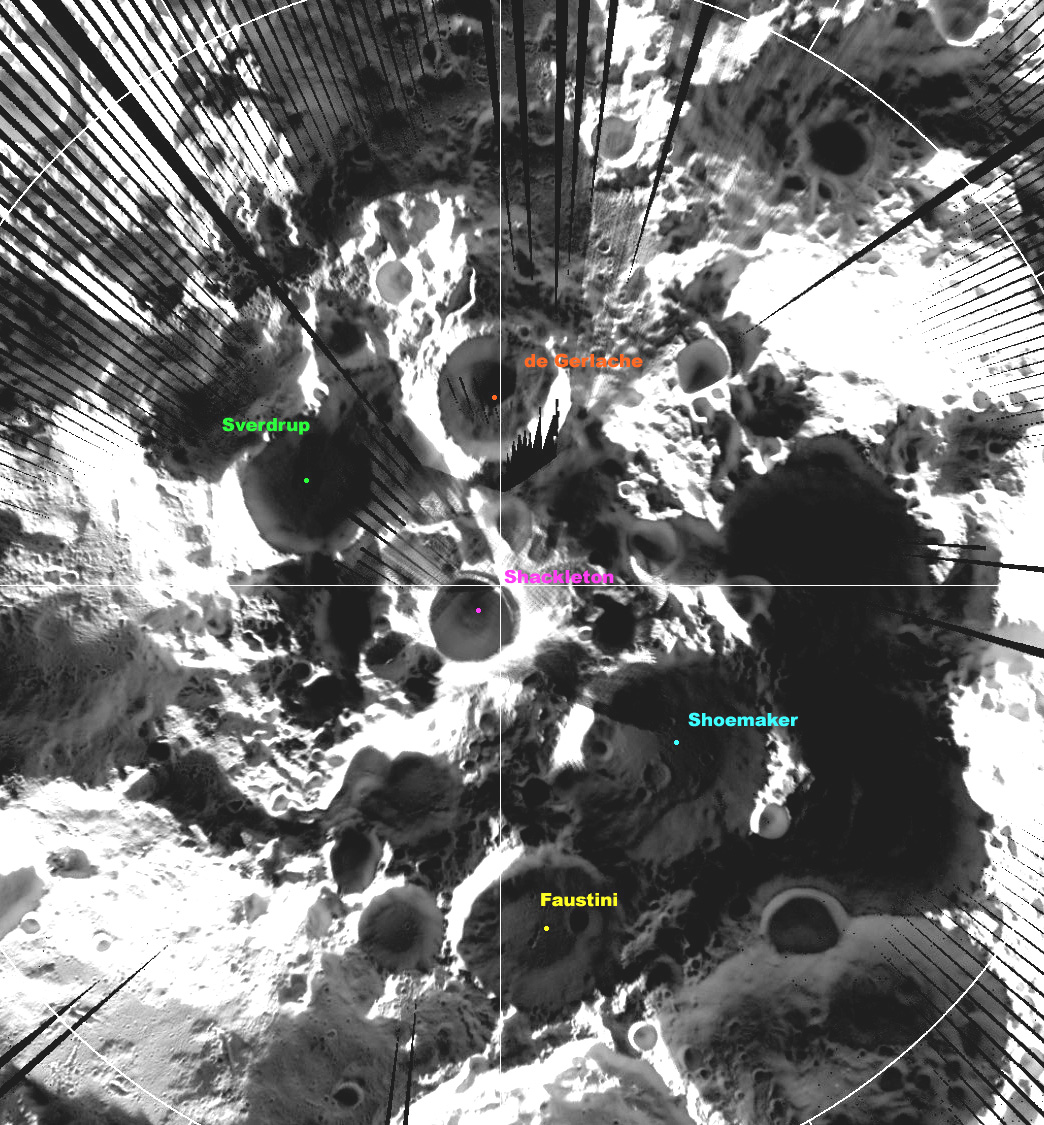
Sverdrup Crater as imaged by Diviner.

Sverdrup is a lunar impact crater that is located about one crater diameter from the southern pole of the Moon. It lies on the far side of the Moon with respect to the Earth, in an area of the surface that is only illuminated by very oblique light from the Sun. The interior part of the crater is cloaked in perpetual darkness, and thus has not been mapped using photography. Portions of the rim are illuminated, however, and give the appearance of a worn formation that has been intruded upon by adjacent formations.

The nearest craters of note to Sverdrup are de Gerlache to the east, and Shackleton at the south pole.

== Proposed lunar base ==
Sverdrup has been proposed as a candidate location for a lunar South Pole settlement.
