= NASA lunar outpost concepts =

Concepts for extended human presence on the Moon

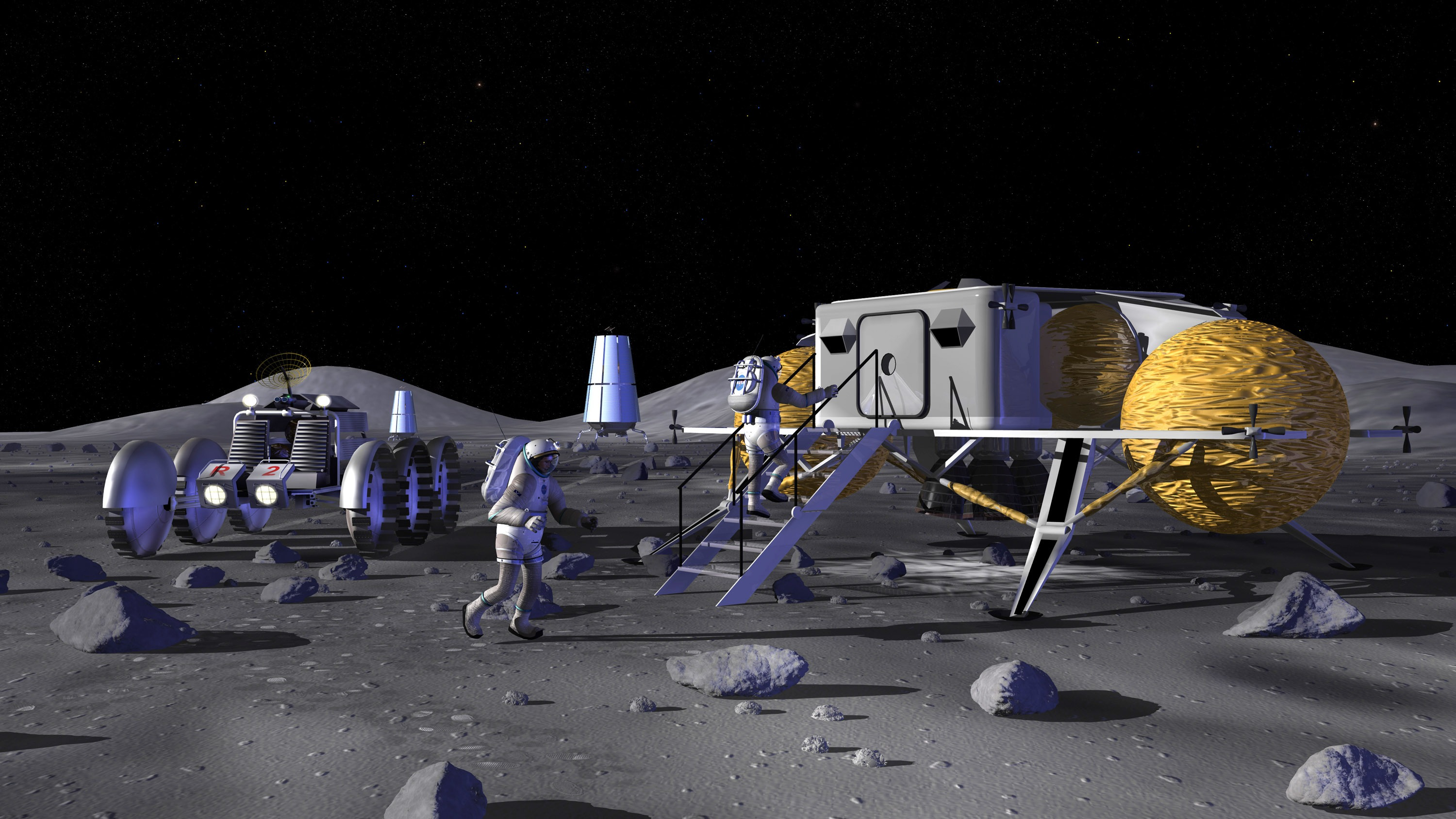
Concept art from NASA showing astronauts entering a lunar outpost. (2006)

The National Aeronautics and Space Administration (NASA) has proposed several concept moonbases for achieving a permanent presence of humans on the Moon since the late 1950s. Research and exploration of the Moon have been a large focus of the organization since the Apollo program. NASA's peak budget was in 1964–1965, when it comprised 4% of all federal spending in service of the Apollo Moon landing project. Though lunar landings since the conclusion of the Apollo program in 1972 have ceased, interest in establishing a permanent habitation on the lunar surface or beyond low Earth orbit has remained steady. Recently, renewed interest in lunar landing has led to increased funding and project planning. NASA requested an increase in the 2020 budget of $1.6 billion, in order to make another crewed mission to the Moon under the Artemis program by 2028 (originally 2024), followed by a sustained presence on the Moon. As of February 2026 NASA plans to send a crewed mission to the lunar surface by early 2028. A crew was selected for the crewed mission to lunar orbit, Artemis II, in April 2023.

== History ==
=== 1958 Lunex Project ===
The Lunex Project, conceptualized in 1958, was a US Air Force plan for a crewed lunar landing prior to the Apollo Program in 1961. It envisaged a 21-person underground Air Force Base on the Moon by 1968 at a total cost of $7.5 billion.

=== 1959 Project Horizon ===
Project Horizon was a 1959 study regarding the United States Army's plan to establish a fort on the Moon by 1967. Heinz-Hermann Koelle, a German rocket engineer of the Army Ballistic Missile Agency (ABMA) led the Project Horizon study. It was proposed that the first landing would be carried out by two "soldier-astronauts" in 1965 and that more construction workers would soon follow. It was posited that through numerous launches (61 Saturn Is and 88 Saturn C-2s), 245 tons of cargo could be transported to the outpost by 1966.

On 8 June 1959, the US Army's Ballistic Missile Agency (ABMA) organized a task force called Project Horizon to assess the feasibility of constructing a military base on the Moon.

Project Horizon proposed using a series of Saturn launches to pre-construct an outpost while in Earth orbit, with the intention of subsequently delivering and landing the completed assembly on the Moon. Additional Saturn launches each month would then ship supplies to the inhabitants.

=== 1984 Johnson Space Center lunar outpost concept ===
In 1984, with the Space Shuttle in service, a team based at the Johnson Space Center (JSC) made a feasibility study for NASA's return to the Moon. It anticipated later studies in using NASA's planned infrastructure – the Shuttle, a Shuttle-derived heavy lift vehicle, a space station, and an orbital transfer vehicle – to build a permanent 18-crew Moon base sometime between 2005 and 2015.

==== Design details ====
The Space Shuttle was to have transported the empty 21,000-kilogram lunar lander and payload to the space station, where they would rendezvous with the 100 ton propellant module.

The first objective was the creation of a small semipermanently crewed "camp" on the lunar surface in 2005–2006.

NASA was to have launched a lunar orbiting space station in 2008–2009 to support the creation of a permanently crewed moonbase by 2009–2010.

This operational surface base would have contained an expanded mining facility, lunar materials processing pilot plants and a lunar agriculture research laboratory; pilot oxygen production and experimental mining facilities would have been landed previously.

The lunar surface facility would have grown to an 18-crew "advanced base" in 2013–2014, consisting of five habitation modules, a geochemical laboratory, chemical/biological lab, geochemical/petrology lab, a particle accelerator, a radio telescope, lunar oxygen, ceramics and metallurgy plants, two shops, three power units (90% lunar-materials derived), one earthmover/crane and three trailers/mobility units. The ultimate goal would be a self-sustaining moonbase by 2017–2018.

The following were the names of vehicles or mission steps associated with the JSC Moon Base:

- Mapper and L-2 Relay Satellite. Development: 1992–1996. First launch: 1996.
- Surface Explorer Rover. Development: 1995–1999. First launch: 1999.
- Expendable Lander. Development: 1995–1999. First launch: 1999.
- Network and Regolith Science. Development: 2002–2004.
- Manned Capsule / OTV. Development: 1999–2003. First launch: 2003.
- Expendable Ascent Stage. Development: 1999–2003. First launch: 2003.
- Lunar Orbital Facilities. Development: 2004–2008. First launch: 2008–2009.
- Camp, temporary manned. Development: 2000–2004. First launch: 2005–2006.
- Base, permanent manned. Development: 2004–2009. First launch: 2009–2010.
- Advanced Base. Development: 2008–2013. First launch: 2013–2014.
- Self-Sustaining Base. Development: 2012–2016. First launch: 2017–2018.

=== 1989 Space Exploration Initiative 90-Day Study on Human Exploration of the Moon and Mars ===
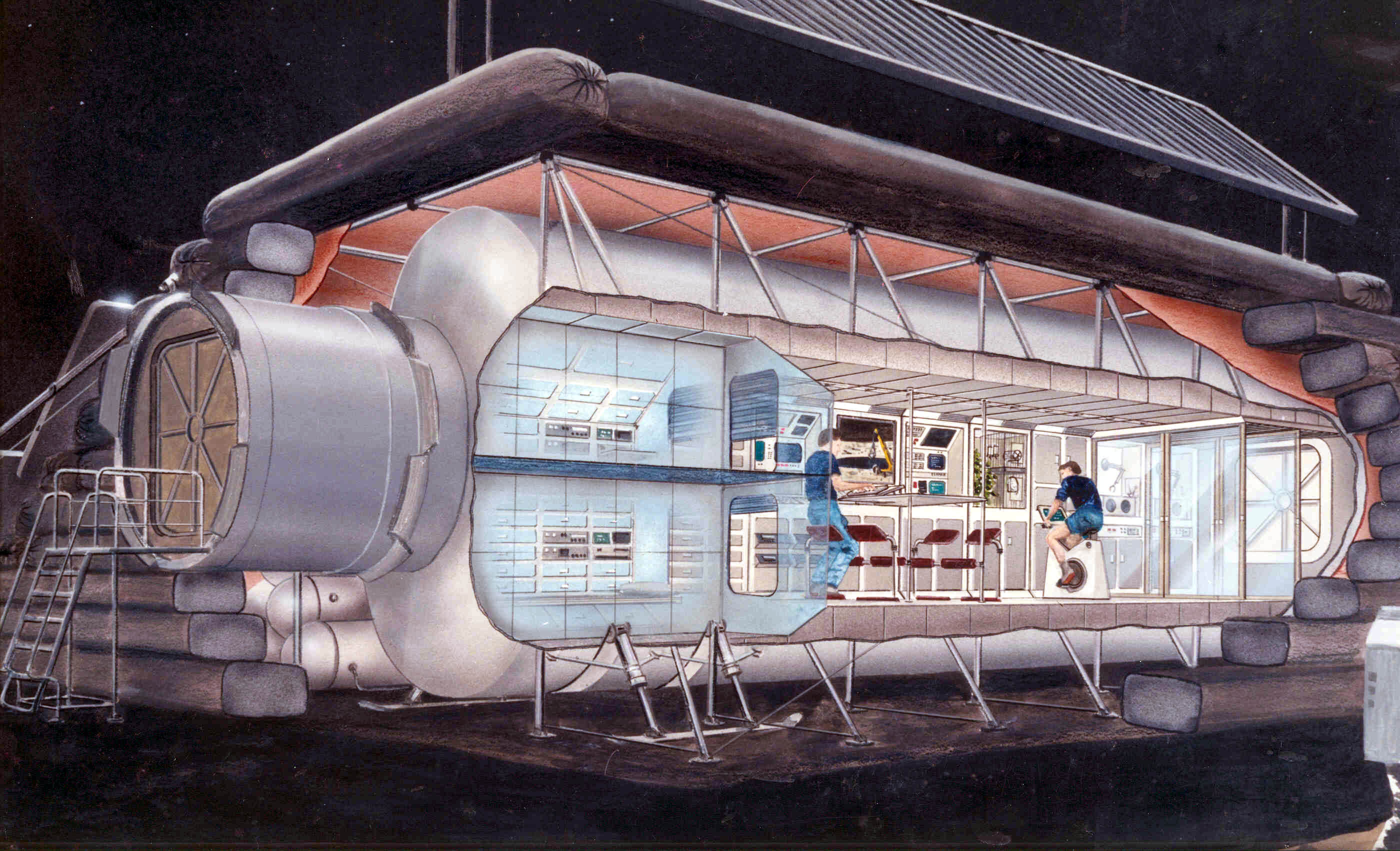
An early lunar outpost design based on a modular design: a connecting tunnel to the left permits the outpost module to connect to landers, rovers or other modules. Much of the equipment is built into standardized racks. Much of the hardware in the early outpost will be dedicated to crew health. Concept: NASA (1990)

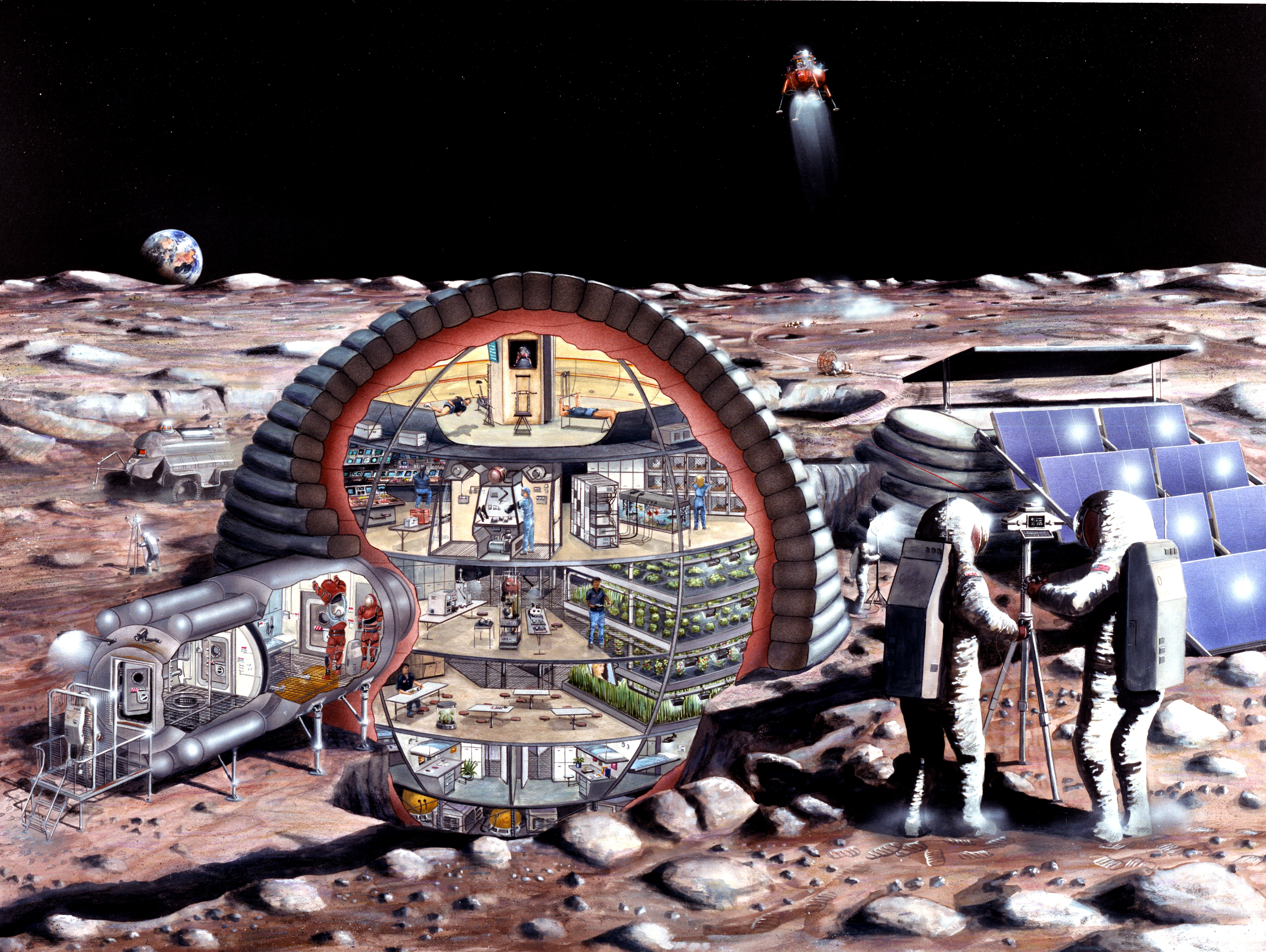
A lunar base for six to twelve people, built into an inflatable spherical habitat. Proportions of the interior volume devoted to different systems equipment are relatively accurate. The heaviest equipment such as for environmental control, and areas in which the crew spends the most time, such as their personal sleep quarters are lowest in the habitat. Work areas for lunar sample analysis, hydroponics, and even for small animals are located in the middle areas. The top deck in this view is a running track on which the sloped surface permits the crew member to use centripetal force rather than gravity to permit running in 1/6 G. Concept: NASA (1989)

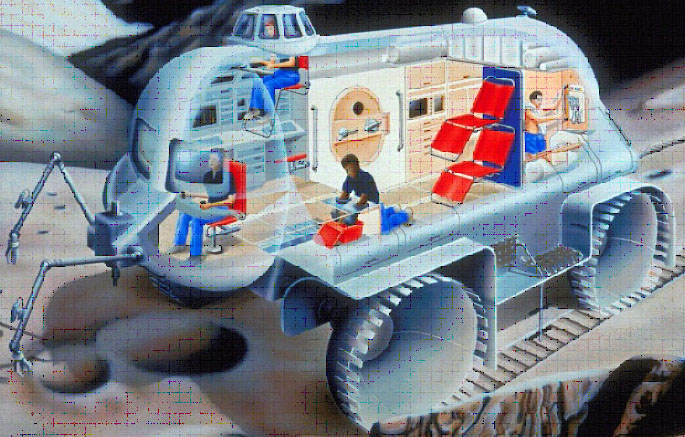
Heavy, pressurized lunar rover for long-duration treks across the Moon's surface. The rover contains all facilities and supplies to house approx 4 crew for up to 2 weeks. A crew airlock permits the crew to exit and enter the rover and may double as a docking port to the lunar base. A smaller sample airlock permits the crew, using remote manipulators mounted on the rover front to select, pick up, and retrieve samples without exiting the rover. The wheel design is based on one of the more favorable flex wheels developed during Apollo. The cupola on top is important for viewing the terrain at a much greater distance and along 360 degrees of the horizon and is based on the International Space Station cupola design. Concept: NASA (1990)

=== 1993–1994 International Lunar Resources Exploration Concept ===
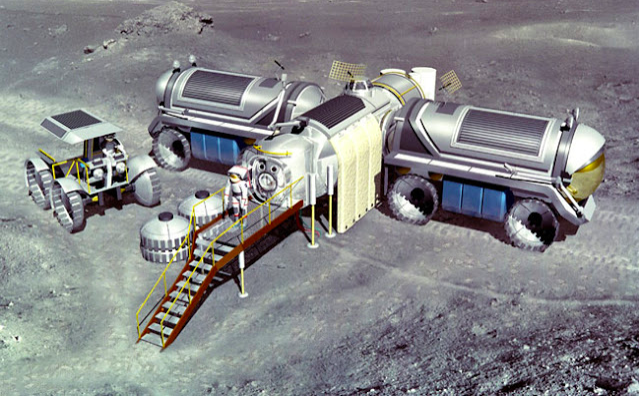
The LREC lunar outpost

The International Lunar Resources Exploration Concept (ILREC) was a proposed mission architecture under President George H. W. Bush's Space Exploration Initiative (SEI) by Kent Joosten, an engineer at Johnson Space Center. The plan would have used the help of international partners, mainly the Soviet Union, to assemble a lunar base and sustainable lunar transportation service. The program was not able to get off the ground as it was proposed at the end of SEI's very short lifespan with the only surviving project being Space Station Freedom (now the International Space Station)

=== 2005 Exploration Systems Architecture Study ===
The Exploration Systems Architecture Study (ESAS) is the official title of a large-scale, system-level study released by NASA in November 2005 in response to American president George W. Bush's announcement on 14 January 2004 of his goal of returning astronauts to the Moon and eventually Mars— known as the Vision for Space Exploration (and unofficially as "Moon, Mars and Beyond" in some aerospace circles, though the specifics of a human "beyond" program were vague).

==== 2006 Reference Architecture ====
On 4 December 2006, NASA announced the conclusion of its Global Exploration Strategy and Lunar Architecture Study. The Lunar Architecture Study's purpose was to "define a series of lunar missions constituting NASA's Lunar campaign to fulfill the Lunar Exploration elements" of the Vision for Space Exploration. The result was a basic plan for a lunar outpost near one of the poles of the Moon, which would permanently house astronauts in six-month shifts. These studies were made before the discovery of water ice (5.6 ± 2.9% by mass) in a polar crater, which may substantially affect plans.

A reference architecture was established for this outpost, based on a location on the rim of the Shackleton crater, located in the immense South Pole-Aitken basin, near the Moon's south pole. At a presentation on 4 December 2006, Doug Cooke, Deputy Associate Administrator, NASA Exploration Systems Mission Directorate, described an area "that is ... sunlit ... 75 to 80 percent of the time, and it is adjacent to a permanently dark region in which there is potentially volatiles that we can extract and use. ... This sunlit area is about the size of the Washington Mall." (approximately 1.25 km^{2}). The Indian Chandrayaan-1 orbiter (2008–2009) helped in the determination of the precise location of the outpost.

Other locations considered for possible lunar outposts included the rim of Peary crater near the lunar north pole and the Malapert Mountain region on the rim of Malapert crater.

The outpost design included:

- Habitation modules
- Solar power units
- Unpressurized rovers
- In-Situ Resource Utilization (ISRU) unit
- Surface mobility carrier

The outpost would have been supplied by a mixed crew and cargo Altair lander, capable of bringing four astronauts and a payload of six tons to the Moon's surface.

As planned, an incremental buildup would begin with four-person crews making several seven-day visits to the moon until their power supplies, rovers and living quarters were operational. The first mission was envisioned for 2020. This would be followed by 180-day missions to prepare for journeys to Mars.

==== Later development ====
George W. Bush's Vision for Space Exploration was eventually replaced with President Barack Obama's space policy.

Updated plans envisioned NASA to construct an outpost over the five years between 2019 and 2024. The United States Congress directed that the U.S. portion, "shall be designated the Neil A. Armstrong Lunar Outpost".

=== 2008 Concepts Study ===
On 6 June 2008, NASA announced a set of six research opportunities and requested proposals for research funding in response to the announcement. The overall budget for research conducted as part of this "Lunar Surface Systems Concepts Study" was believed to be $2 million. Proposals were selected and contracts awarded in August 2008 by the NASA Constellation Lunar Surface Systems Project Office (LSSPO).

=== 2010–2011 surface system concept review ===
The LSSPO was established at the Johnson Space Center in August 2007. The LSSPO was studying lunar surface systems such as "habitation systems", ISRU, rovers, power production and storage, systems to meet science and exploration objectives and safety systems. The LSSPO was expected to conduct a surface system concept review in the 2010 or 2011 timeframe.

== Artemis program ==
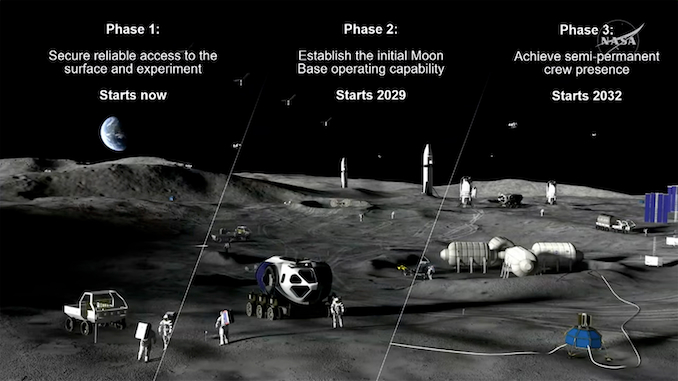
NASA's plan presented in 2026 for the establishment of a permanent lunar base

The Artemis program is a planned crewed spaceflight program carried out predominately by NASA, U.S. commercial spaceflight companies, and international partners such as the European Space Agency (ESA), JAXA, and the Canadian Space Agency (CSA) with the goal of landing "the first woman and the next man" on the Moon, specifically at the lunar south pole region in 2028. NASA sees Artemis as the next step towards the long-term goal of establishing a sustainable presence on the Moon, laying the foundation for private companies to build a lunar economy, and eventually sending humans to Mars. One primary target is Shackleton crater. In 2028 NASA plans on launching the Lunar Surface Asset, a small habitat to the surface of the Moon on either an SLS Block 1B or through an Artemis Support Mission on a commercial launcher. This would be the first crewed lunar base.

=== Artemis Base Camp ===
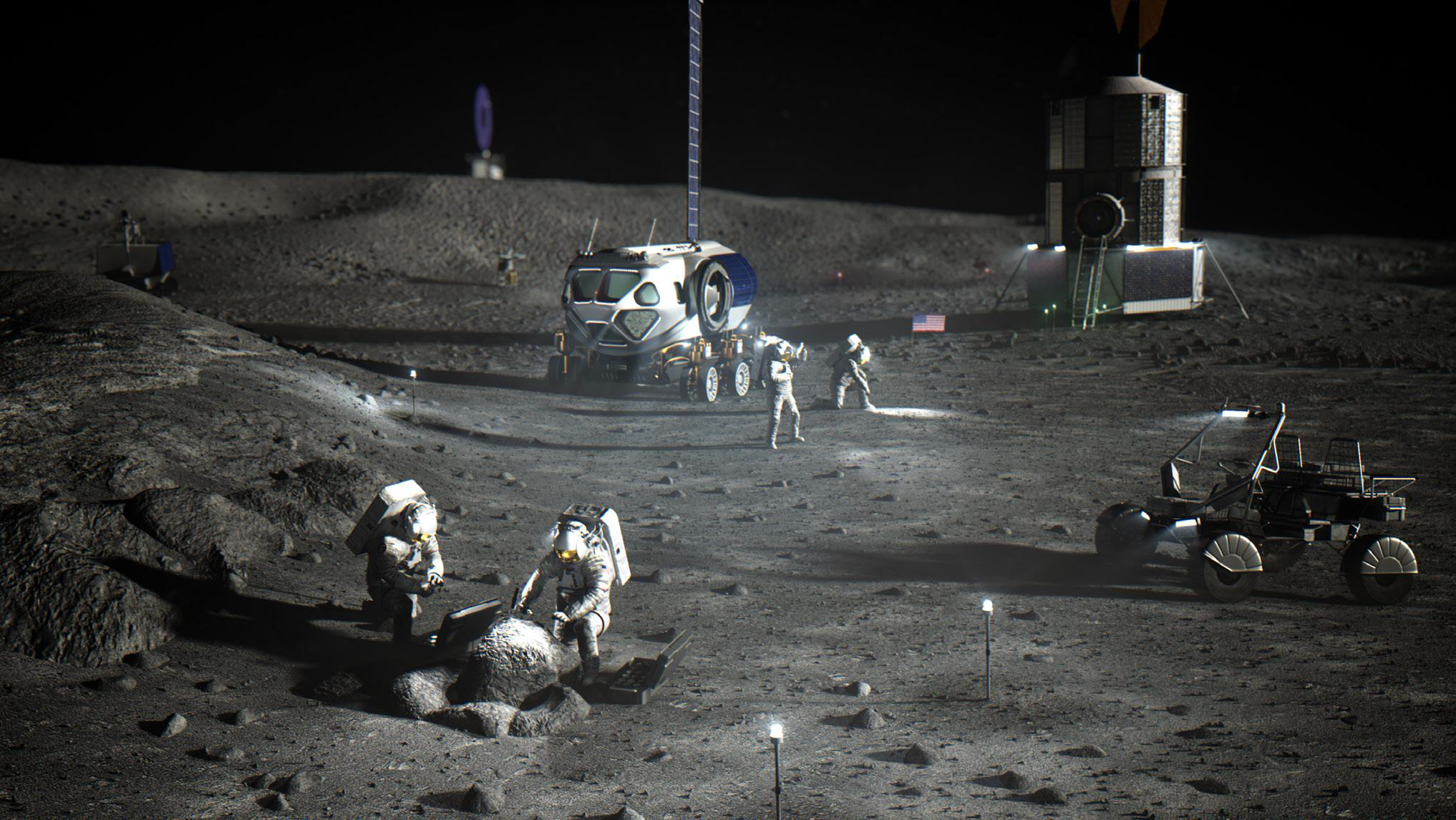
Concept art of Artemis Base Camp

The US-led Artemis Program has scheduled several crewed landings at the Moon's south polar region, starting with Artemis IV planned for early 2028 at the earliest, setting up five temporary base camps with the Human Landing Systems (HLS) until Artemis VIII is planned to set up the fixed Foundational Surface Habitat (FSH) of the Artemis Base Camp in the 2030s. India was also invited to contribute to the Moonbase project.

== Lunar Gateway ==
A station in lunar orbit can serve as a communications hub, temporary habitation module, and holding area for rovers and other robots intended for an outpost on lunar ground. NASA leads a proposal for such a station, named Lunar Gateway. The omnibus spending bill passed by the U.S. Congress in March 2018 provided NASA with $504 million for preliminary studies during the 2019 fiscal year. The final funding amount enacted by Congress was slightly lower at $450 million. However this was cancelled in March 2026 in favor of an expanded Moon base.

== Justification ==
In the words of former NASA Administrator, Michael D. Griffin,

The goal isn't just scientific exploration. ... It's also about extending the range of human habitat out from Earth into the solar system as we go forward in time. ... In the long run a single-planet species will not survive. ... If we humans want to survive for hundreds of thousands or millions of years, we must ultimately populate other planets. Now, today the technology is such that this is barely conceivable. We're in the infancy of it. ... I'm talking about that one day, I don't know when that day is, but there will be more human beings who live off the Earth than on it. We may well have people living on the moon. We may have people living on the moons of Jupiter and other planets. We may have people making habitats on asteroids ... I know that humans will colonize the solar system and one day go beyond.

== Criticism ==
Criticisms come from groups that want the human exploration money diverted to Mars, from those who prefer uncrewed exploration, and from those who simply want the money spent elsewhere. The criticisms listed here mostly predate the discovery of significant amounts of polar water ice. Jeff Foust, writing for The Space Review, called the six themes that NASA released too "broad" and the explanations supporting them "shallow." He also argues that a Moonbase is a poor use of resources, since "science can be done for far less money by robotic missions—which also don't put human lives at risk." The Los Angeles Times seconded that in an editorial, saying "Manned moon flight may appeal to baby boomers, but it makes little scientific sense for most space missions these days. Robots can now perform, or be developed to perform, most of the tasks people would do at a moon station."

Columnist Gregg Easterbrook, who has reported on the space program for decades, has criticized the plans as a poor use of resources. He writes that,

Although, of course, the base could yield a great discovery, its scientific value is likely to be small while its price is extremely high. Worse, moon-base nonsense may for decades divert NASA resources from the agency's legitimate missions, draining funding from real needs in order to construct human history's silliest white elephant.

According to Easterbrook, the billions of dollars that a lunar colony might cost should instead be devoted to exploring the Solar System with space probes; space observatories; and protecting the Earth from near-Earth asteroids.

Buzz Aldrin, the second of twelve men to have walked on the Moon, disagrees with NASA's current goals and priorities, including their plans for a lunar outpost. While not necessarily opposed to sending people back to the Moon, Aldrin argues that NASA should concentrate on a human mission to Mars and leave further lunar exploration and the establishment of a base there to a consortium of other countries under U.S. leadership. In a July 2009 editorial in the Washington Post, he said that NASA's Vision for Space Exploration "is not visionary; nor will it ultimately be successful in restoring American space leadership. Like its Apollo predecessor, this plan will prove to be a dead-end littered with broken spacecraft, broken dreams, and broken policies." He continued by saying that:

the lunar surface ... is a poor location for homesteading. The moon is a lifeless, barren world, its stark desolation matched by its hostility to all living things. And replaying the glory days of Apollo will not advance the cause of American space leadership or inspire the support and enthusiasm of the public and the next generation of space explorers.

== See also ==
- Lunar Architecture (NASA)
- Exploration Systems Architecture Study
- Project Constellation
- Artemis program
- Vision for Space Exploration
- Lunar Reconnaissance Orbiter
- Colonization of the Moon
