= Shoemaker (lunar crater) =

Lunar impact crater

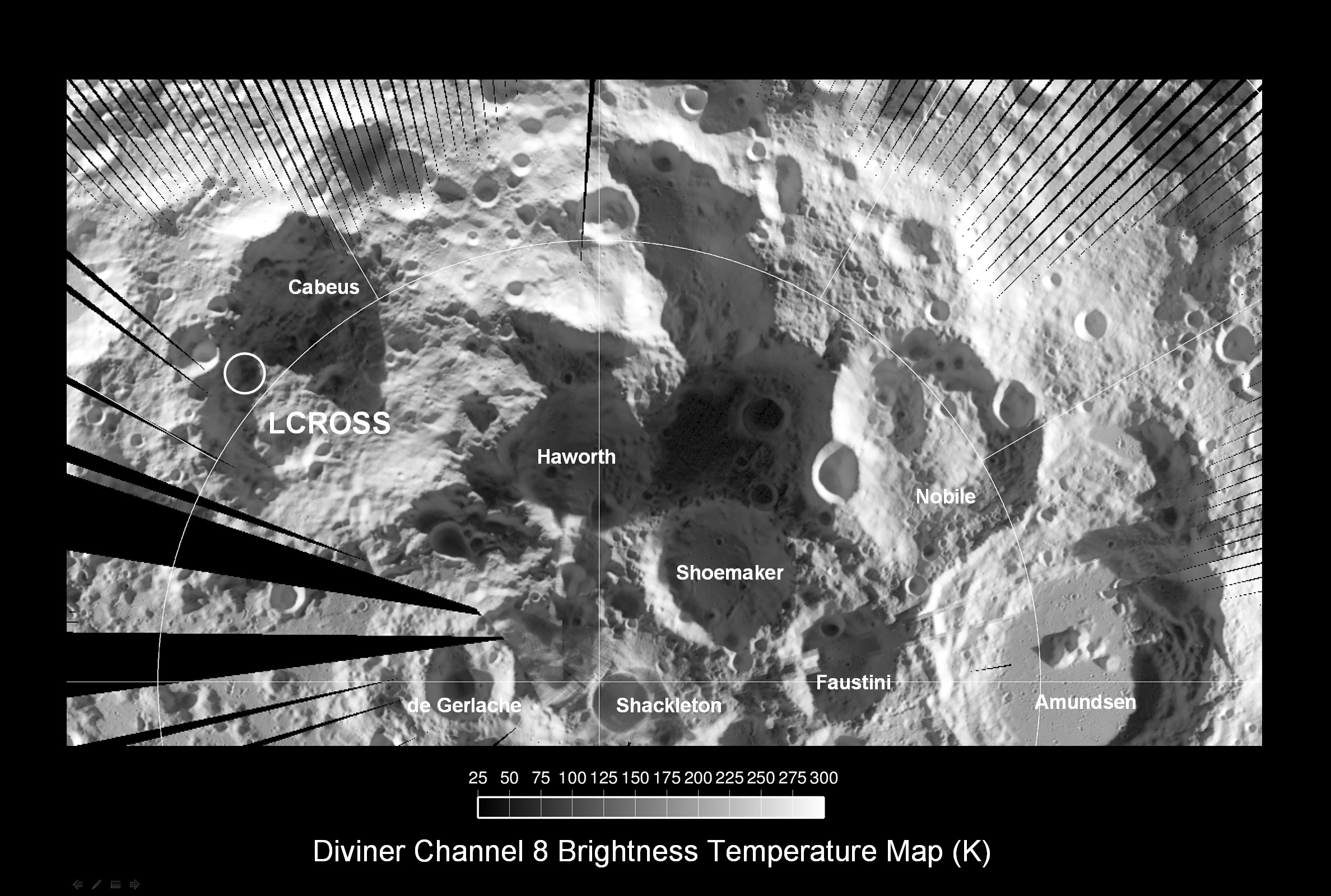
- Shoemaker Crater as imaged by Diviner. NASA photo.
- Coordinates: 88.1°S 44.9°E
- Diameter: 50.9 km
- Depth: 3.81 km (2.37 mi)
- Colongitude: 342° at sunrise
- Formation: Pre-Nectarian
- Eponym: Eugene Shoemaker

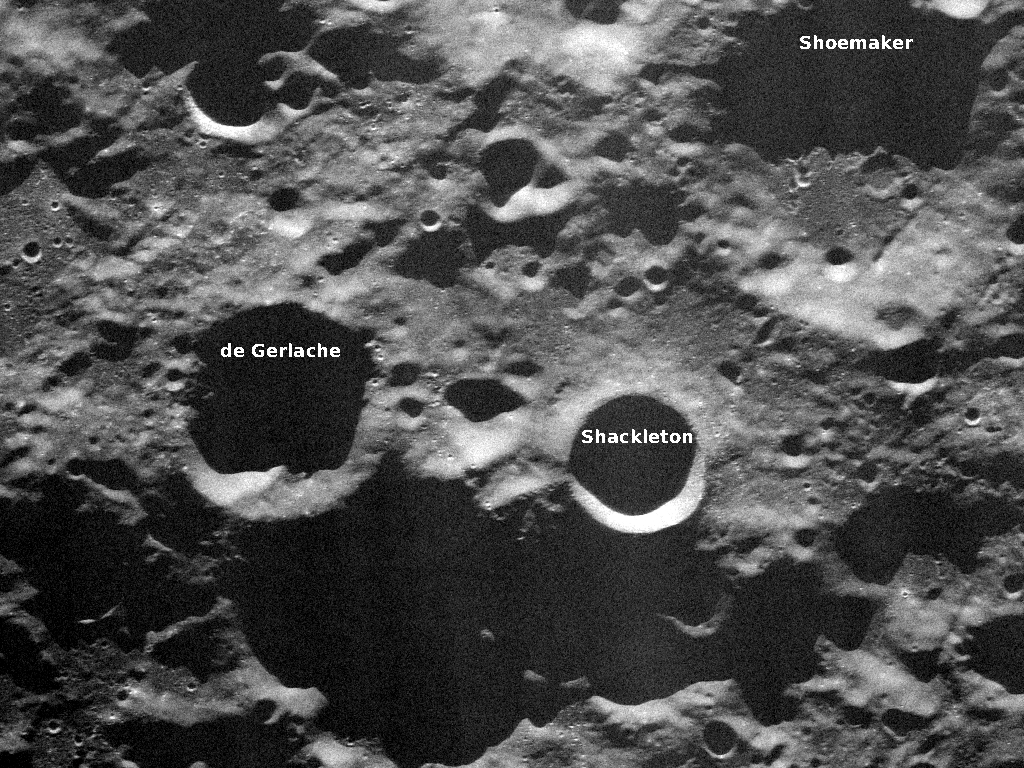
Shoemaker Crater as imaged by Earth-based radar.

Shoemaker is a lunar impact crater located near the southern pole of the Moon, within half a crater diameter of Shackleton. It lies to the south of the crater Malapert, to the east of Haworth, and just to the west of the similar-sized Faustini.

== Observations ==
NASA simulation of the lunar south pole illumination in 2025 in steps of 2 hours – teal rings are in steps of 2° ≈ 60.6 km (37.7 mi)

This formation dates to the Pre-Nectarian period of the lunar geologic timescale. The rim of Shoemaker is circular and worn, with some small craters along the inner wall. Due to the lack of illumination (it is a crater of eternal darkness), the albedo of the interior floor surface remains unknown.

Prior to being given its current name by the IAU, this formation had been informally named Mawson (after the Antarctic explorer Douglas Mawson). It was officially named Shoemaker in honor of Eugene Shoemaker, the geologist whose remains were on board the Lunar Prospector spacecraft that impacted this crater floor. Deposition of Shoemaker's remains was criticized by the Navajo Nation as a desecration of the venerated Moon.

== Cold trap deposits ==
This crater became of interest to scientists when the Lunar Prospector detected unusually high concentrations of hydrogen on the floor of this and other nearby craters using a neutron spectrometer. The floor of this crater is kept in permanent shadow from the Sun, and thus maintains a temperature below 100 K (−173 °C). Thus the floor forms a cold trap, and any molecules of water that wander into the crater from cometary impacts can deposit on the floor and remain there almost permanently. The instruments on board Lunar Prospector gave a concentration of about 146 ppm of hydrogen, compared to 50 ppm for the average lunar surface.

The topography of this crater was subsequently measured using the Goldstone 70 m antenna to irradiate it with 3.5 cm radar. Two 34 m antennae, located 20 km apart, received the echoes, and the results were used to generate a topographic map with 150 m resolution.

On July 31, 1999, Lunar Prospector was deliberately crashed into the floor of this crater to determine if a plume of water vapor would be detected. The apparent detection of water and the shallow rim of this crater made it a suitable target for this experiment. However the outcome was unsuccessful. Subsequent tests have failed to confirm the presence of water in the crater floor, so the hydrogen found in the crater bottom is likely to prove more difficult to extract than had been originally hoped.
