= Shackleton (crater) =

Lunar impact crater

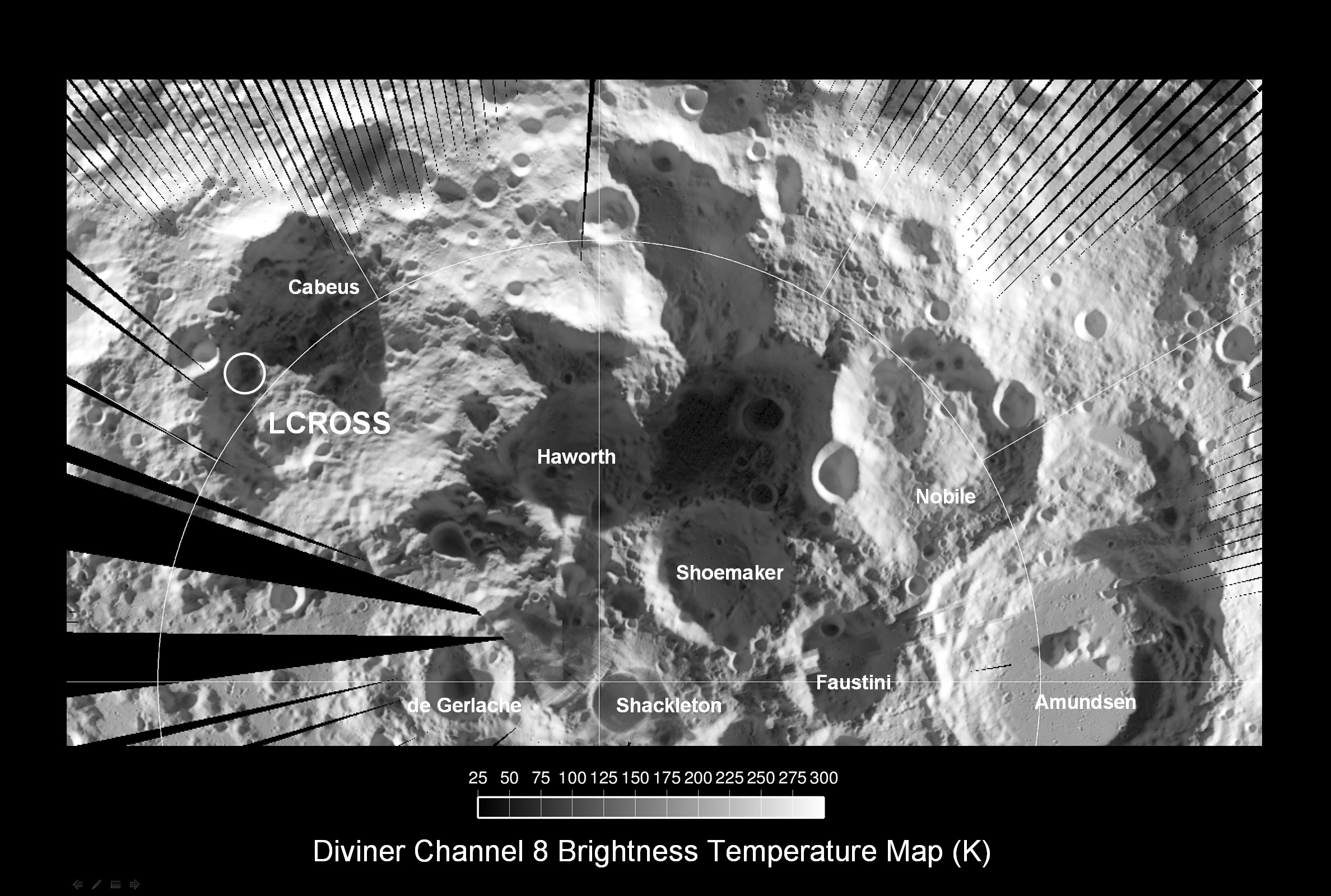
- South lunar pole as imaged by the Diviner instrument on the NASA's Lunar Reconnaissance Orbiter. Shackleton is at bottom center.
- Coordinates: 89.67°S 129.78°E
- Diameter: 21.0 km
- Depth: 4.2 km
- Colongitude: 0° at sunrise
- Eponym: Ernest Shackleton

Shackleton is an impact crater that lies at the lunar south pole. The peaks along the crater's rim are exposed to almost continual sunlight, while the interior is perpetually in shadow. The low-temperature interior of this crater functions as a cold trap that may capture and freeze volatiles such as water shed during comet impacts on the Moon. Measurements by the Lunar Prospector spacecraft showed higher than normal amounts of hydrogen within the crater, which may indicate the presence of water ice. The crater is named after Antarctic explorer Ernest Shackleton.

== Geography ==
The Moon's south pole passes through Shackleton's crater rim. The crater is conical in shape, measuring 21 km (13 miles) in diameter and 4.2 km (2.6 miles) deep. Its interior is marked by several smaller craters hundreds of meters in diameter, and its floor is hilly. The rim is slightly raised about the surrounding surface and it has an outer rampart that has been only lightly impacted. No significant craters intersect the rim, and it is sloped about 1.5° toward the direction 50–90° from the Earth. From the Earth, it is viewed edge-on in a region of rough, cratered terrain. It is located near the rim of the ancient South Pole–Aitken basin on the edge of a mountain.

Because the orbit of the Moon is tilted only 1.5° from the ecliptic, the interior of this crater lies in perpetual darkness. Estimates of the area in permanent shadow were obtained from Earth-based radar studies. Peaks along the rim of the crater are almost continually illuminated by sunlight, spending about 80–90% of each lunar orbit exposed to the Sun. Continuously illuminated mountains have been termed peaks of eternal light and have been predicted to exist since the early nineteenth century.

The shadowed portion of the crater was imaged with the Terrain Camera of the Japanese SELENE spacecraft using the illumination of sunlight reflected off the rim. The interior of the crater consists of a symmetrical 30° slope that leads down to a 6.6 km (4.1 miles) diameter floor. The handful of craters along the interior span no more than a few hundred meters. The bottom is covered by an uneven mound-like feature that is 300 to 400 m (980–1,310 ft) thick. The central peak is about 200 m (660 ft) in height.

=== Naming ===
This crater is named after Ernest Shackleton, an Anglo-Irish explorer of Antarctica from 1901 until his death in 1922. The name was officially adopted by the International Astronomical Union in 1994. Nearby craters of note include Shoemaker, Haworth, de Gerlache, Sverdrup, Slater, and Faustini. Somewhat farther away, on the eastern hemisphere of the lunar near side, are the larger craters Amundsen and Scott, named after two other early explorers of the Antarctic continent.

== Geology ==
Shackleton is a well-preserved simple crater in a region of ancient, rugged pre-Nectarian terrain associated with the South Pole–Aitken basin rim. The South Pole–Aitken basin is estimated to have formed 3.9 to 4.3 billion years ago, excavating large portions of the ancient lunar crust and potentially some of the upper mantle. Shackleton is expected to lie in a region made of ancient noritic crust. Its formative impact event exposed ancient material, including suspected deposits of purest anorthosite (>98% plagioclase).

Due to its structural freshness, Shackleton was originally thought to have formed about 1.1 to 3.3 billion years ago in the Moon's Eratosthenian period. Later analysis using data from the Lunar Orbiter Laser Altimeter places Shackleton's formation 3.69 billion years ago, during the Moon's Imbrian period. It is several hundreds of millions of years younger than some neighboring craters. Simulations show that it was likely formed by a chondritic impactor around 1.5 km (0.93 mi) in size, striking the surface with a vertical velocity of 15 km/s (9.3 mi/s). After impact, at least 20 cubic kilometres (4.8 mi^{3}) of impact melt gathered at the crater's floor. Its uneven floor may be due to large blocks of rock, central peaks or rings, or from landslides.

=== Water ice ===
Shackleton has been in the proximity of the south lunar pole for at least the last two billion years.

The continuous shadows in the south polar craters cause the floors of these formations to maintain a temperature that never exceeds about 100 K (−173 °C; −280 °F). For Shackleton, the average temperature was determined to be about 90 K (−183 °C; −298 °F), reaching 88 K at the crater floor. Under these conditions, the estimated rate of loss from any ice in the interior would be 10^{−26} to 10^{−27} m/s. Any water vapor that arrives here following a cometary impact on the Moon would lie permanently frozen on or below the surface. However, the surface albedo of the crater floor matches the lunar far-side, suggesting that there is no exposed surface ice.

== Exploration ==
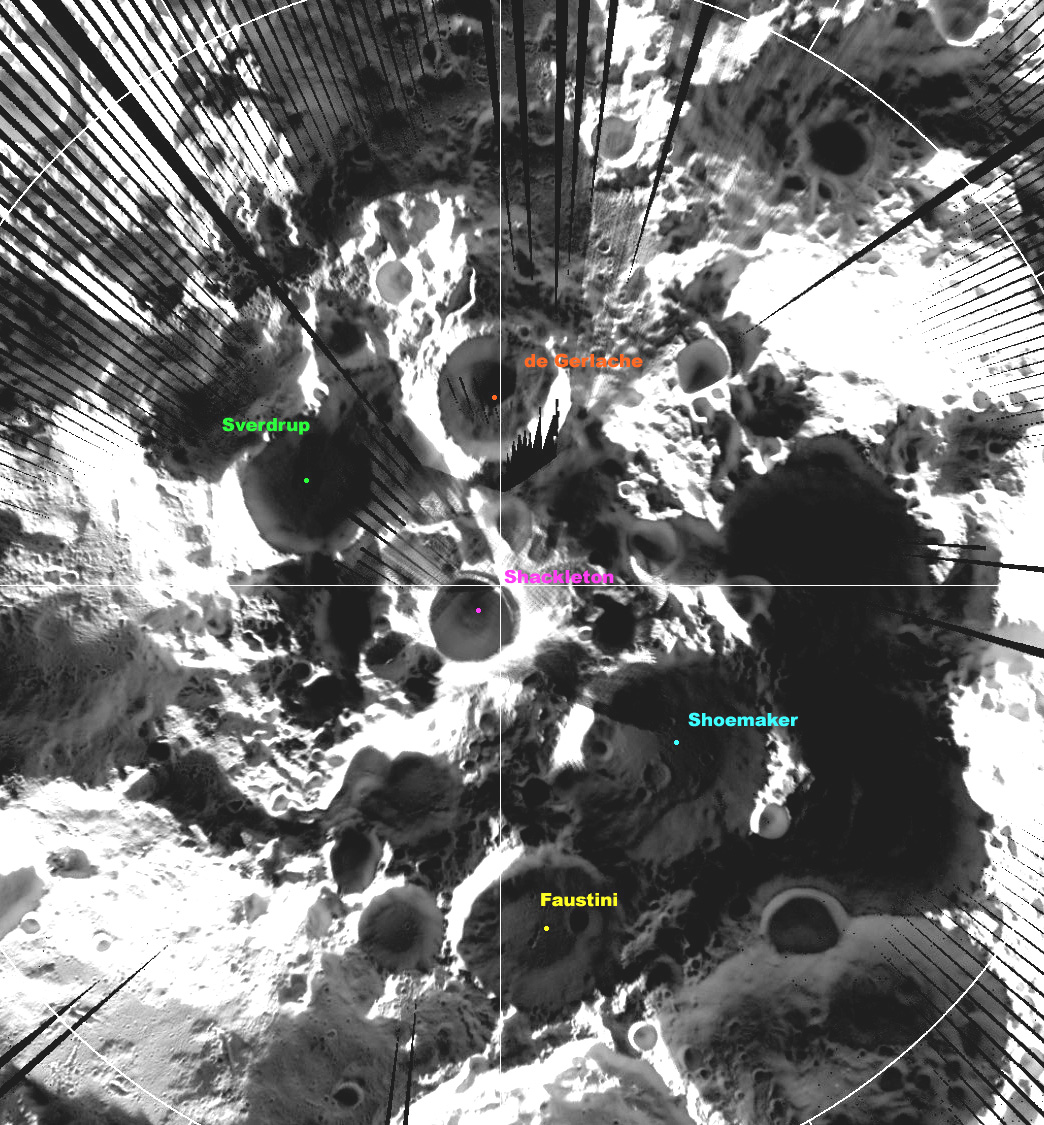
Shackleton as imaged by LRO

Shackleton has been the subject of much study due to its proximity to the south pole. From the perspective of the Earth, this crater lies along the southern limb of the Moon, making observation difficult. Detailed mapping of the polar regions and farside of the Moon did not occur until the advent of orbiting spacecraft. Shackleton lies entirely within the rim of the immense South Pole-Aitken basin, which is one of the largest known impact formations in the Solar System. This basin is over 12 kilometers deep, and an exploration of its properties could provide useful information about the lunar interior.

A neutron spectrometer on board the Lunar Prospector spacecraft detected enhanced concentrations of hydrogen close to the northern and southern lunar poles, including the crater Shackleton. At the end of this mission in July 1999, the spacecraft was crashed into the nearby crater Shoemaker in the hope of detecting from Earth-based telescopes an impact-generated plume containing water vapor. The impact event did not produce any detectable water vapor, and this may be an indication that the hydrogen is not in the form of hydrated minerals, or that the impact site did not contain any ice.

From Earth-based radar and spacecraft images of the crater edge, Shackleton appears to be relatively intact; much like a young crater that has not been significantly eroded from subsequent impacts. This may mean that the inner sides are relatively steep, which may make traversing the sides relatively difficult for a robotic vehicle.

Radar studies preceding and following the Lunar Prospector mission demonstrate that the inner walls of Shackleton are similar in reflective characteristics to those of some sunlit craters. In particular, the surroundings appear to contain a significant number of blocks in its ejecta blanket, suggesting that its radar properties are a result of surface roughness, and not ice deposits, as was previously suggested from a radar experiment involving the Clementine mission. This interpretation, however, is not universally agreed upon within the scientific community. Radar images of the crater at a wavelength of 13 cm show no evidence for water ice deposits.

Optical imaging inside the crater was done for the first time by the Japanese lunar orbiter spacecraft Kaguya in 2007. It did not have any evidence of significant amount of water ice, down to the image resolution of 10 m per pixel.

On November 15, 2008, a 34-kg probe made a hard landing near the crater. The Moon Impact Probe (MIP) was launched from the Indian Chandrayaan-1 spacecraft and reached the surface 25 minutes later. The probe carried a radar altimeter, video imaging system, and a mass spectrometer, which detected the presence of water during the descent.

In 2027, China's Chang'e 7 mission will attempt to land on the illuminated rim of Shackleton crater.

The crater is a major landing site candidate for the Artemis program and could be explored by a crew starting in 2028 with a possible first lunar outpost after 2030.

== Potential uses ==
NASA simulation of the lunar south pole illumination in 2025 in steps of 2 hours – teal rings are in steps of 2° ≈ 60.6 km (37.7 mi)

Some sites along Shackleton's rim receive almost constant illumination. At these locales sunlight is almost always available for conversion into electricity using solar panels, potentially making them good locations for future Moon landings. These areas likely have temperatures of −50±10 °C, compared to the lunar equator where temperatures span from −150 °C to 100 °C. The smaller temperature variations at the rim are less harmful for long-term surface operations.

Shackleton has also been proposed as a future site for a large infrared telescope. The low temperature of the crater floor makes it ideal for infrared observations, and solar cells placed along the rim could provide near-continuous power to the observatory. About 120 kilometers from the crater lies the 5-km tall Malapert Mountain, a peak that is perpetually visible from the Earth, and which could serve as a radio relay station when suitably equipped.

In 2006, NASA named the rim of Shackleton as a potential candidate for its lunar outpost, originally slated to be up and running by 2020 and continuously staffed by a crew by 2024. The location would promote self-sustainability for lunar residents, as perpetual sunlight on the south pole would provide energy for solar panels. Furthermore, the shadowed polar regions are believed to contain the frozen water necessary for human consumption and could also be harvested for fuel manufacture.

== See also ==
- Colonization of the Moon
- Lunar ice
