= Slater (crater) =

Lunar surface depression

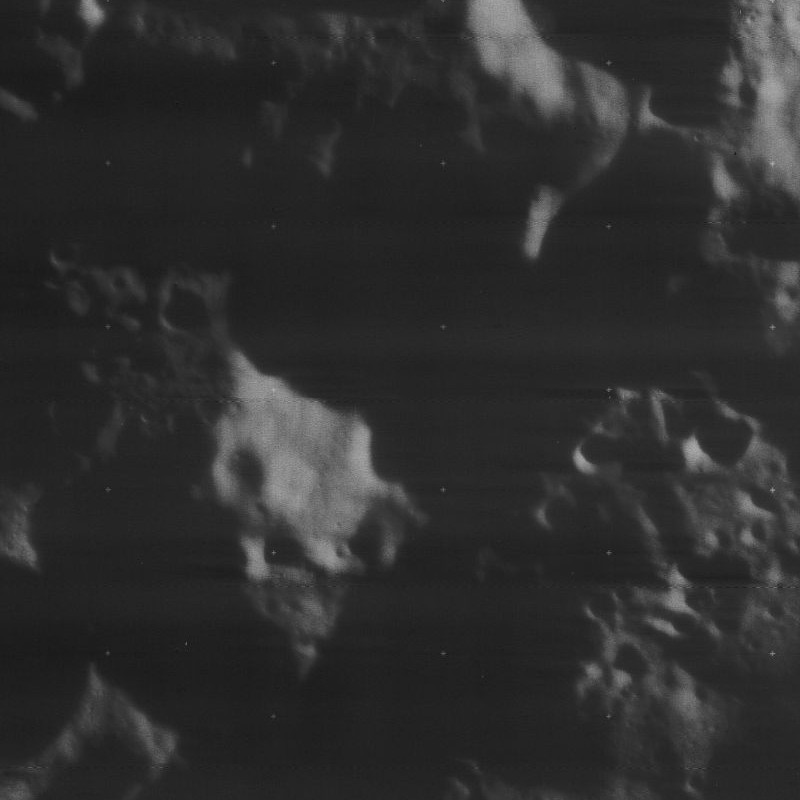
- Lunar Orbiter 4 image
- Coordinates: 88.08°S 111.29°E
- Diameter: 25.12 km
- Depth: Unknown
- Eponym: David Charles Slater

Slater is an impact crater near the south pole of the Moon. Like nearby Shackleton, the floor of the crater is in nearly perpetual darkness.

The crater's name was adopted by the IAU in May 2015, after the American planetary scientist David Charles Slater.
