= De Gerlache (crater) =

Lunar impact crater

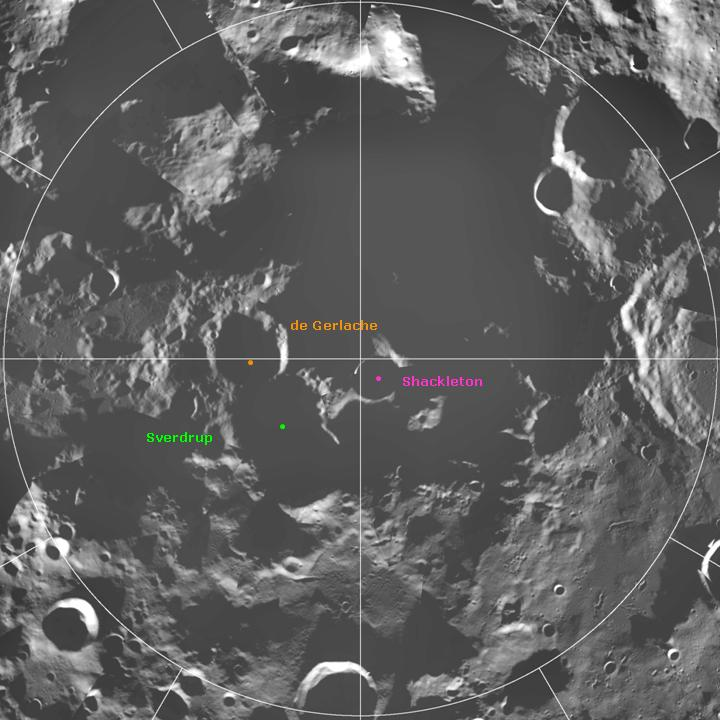
- de Gerlache crater as imaged by Clementine.
- Coordinates: 88.5°S 87.1°W
- Diameter: 32.4 km (20.1 mi)
- Depth: 7.5 km (4.7 mi)
- Colongitude: 105° at sunrise
- Eponym: Adrien de Gerlache

de Gerlache is a lunar impact crater that is located along the southern limb of the Moon, within a crater diameter of Shackleton at the south pole. From the Earth this crater is seen from the edge, and it lies in perpetual darkness. Thus little or no detail can be seen of this crater, other than the edge of the rim. However, the crater is clearly visible in Earth-based radar images.

The crater is roughly circular, with some slight wear. It has a diameter of 32.4 km and a depth of 7.5 km. The interior includes a smaller impact crater in the northwest quadrant, and some arc-shaped features that may be the result of slope movement. A pocket within the crater interior is permanently shadowed from the Sun, thereby functioning as a cold trap where carbon dioxide ice can potentially remain without sublimating.

No craters of note overlie the rim, but a larger crater named after Matthew Henson (1866–1955) is joined to the western rim. Attached to the southern rim is the small crater Marvin, and a crater named after Paul Spudis (1952–2018) lies further south toward Shackleton. A ridge connecting de Gerlacke with Shackleton is of potential interest for a future lander mission due to its favorable illumination conditions.

This formation was identified by Jean-Luc Margot and Donald B. Campbell, who jointly proposed the name to the International Astronomical Union (IAU). The name, honoring the Belgian explorer Adrien de Gerlache (1866-1934), was adopted by the IAU in 2000. In April 2023, a smaller crater on the floor of de Gerlache was named after Canadian–American rocket and jet propulsion engineer Yvonne Brill (1924–2013) by the IAU.

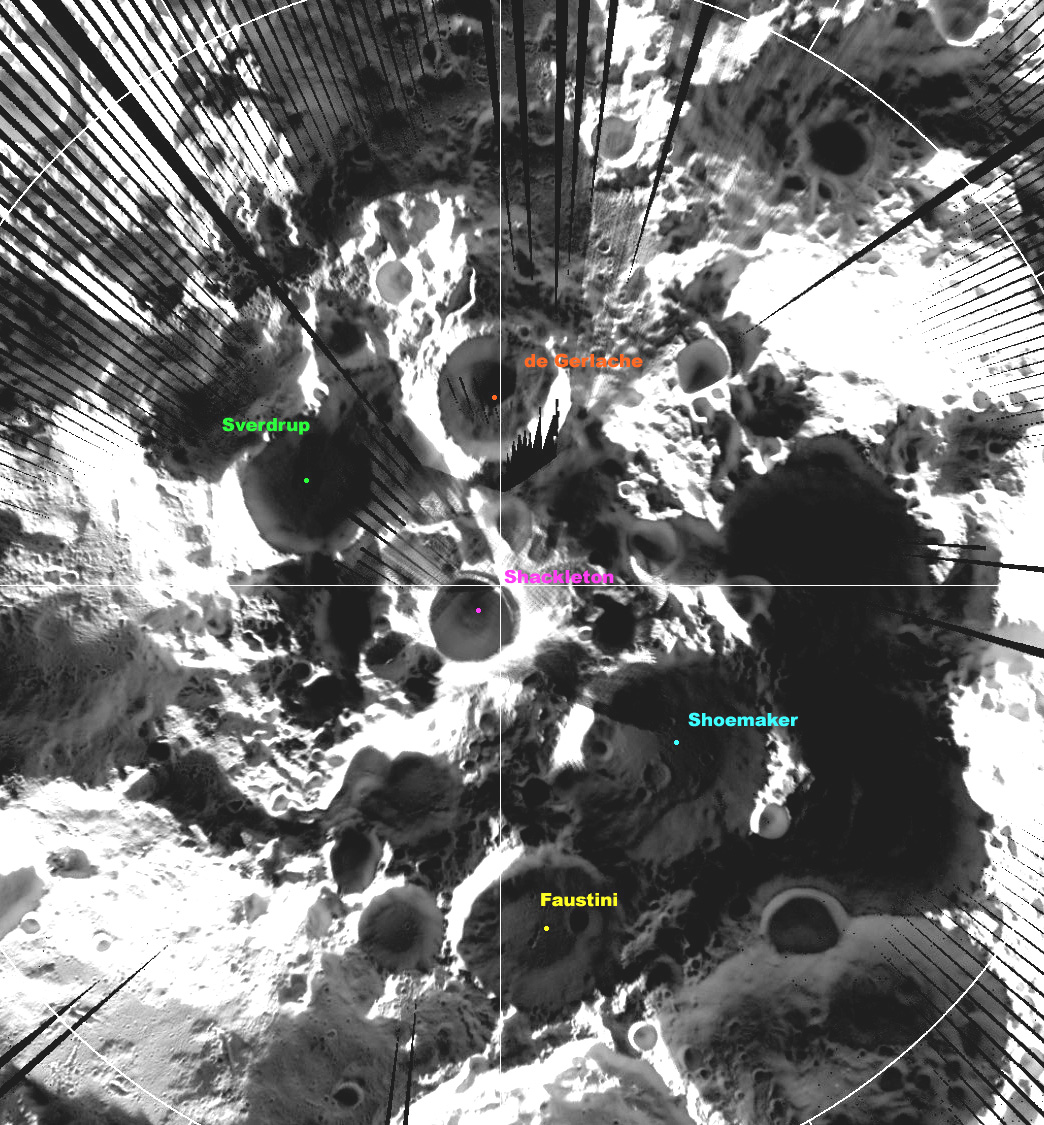
de Gerlache crater as imaged by LRO.

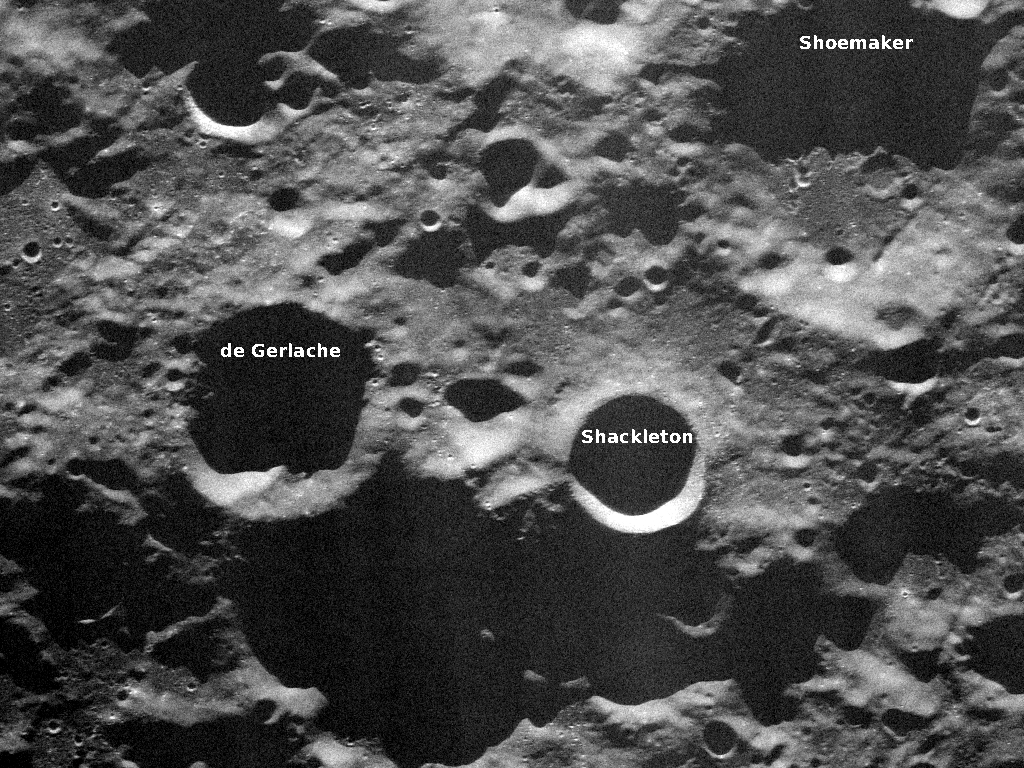
de Gerlache crater as imaged by Earth-based radar.
