= Haworth (crater) =

Lunar surface depression

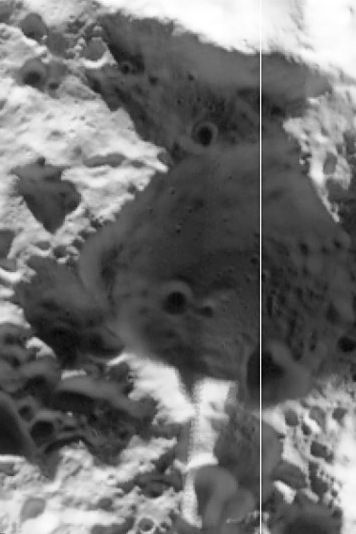
- Haworth Crater as imaged by Diviner. NASA photo.
- Coordinates: 86.9°S 4°W
- Diameter: 51.4 km
- Formation: Pre-Nectarian
- Eponym: Walter Haworth

Haworth is an impact crater that lies at the south pole region of the Moon. The crater is named after British chemist Walter Haworth.

According to a 2015 study by Tye et al., Haworth was formed sometime during the Pre-Nectarian period, meaning it is at least 3.9 Ga (billion years) old. Due to Haworth's position near the lunar south pole, large amounts of the crater are permanently shadowed regions. These regions are very cold; many are believed to never reach temperatures above 40 Kelvin, making Haworth colder than nearby craters such as Shackleton and Faustini. Haworth and its surrounding low-lying areas are home to frost, which may be partly caused by these particularly low temperatures.

== See also ==
- Lunar south pole
