= Malapert (crater) =

Lunar surface depression caused by impact

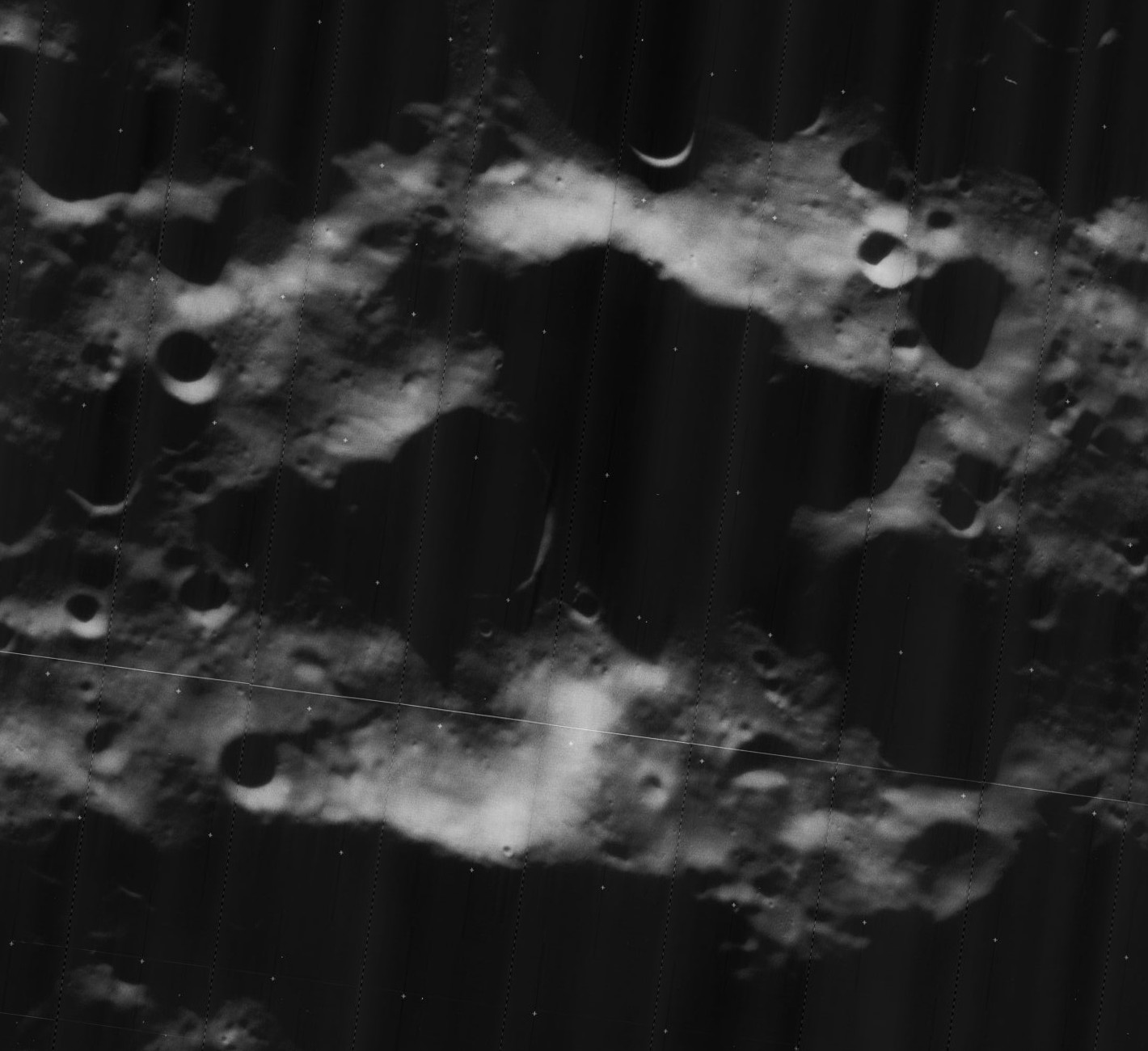
- Lunar Orbiter 4 image with north at top. Malapert Mountain is the bright peak near bottom center.
- Coordinates: 84.9°S 12.9°E
- Diameter: 69 km
- Depth: Unknown
- Colongitude: 0° at sunrise
- Eponym: Charles Malapert

Malapert is a lunar impact crater that lies near the south pole of the Moon, named for 17th century astronomer Charles Malapert. British astronomer T. W. Webb noted "this is the nearest visible crater to S. Pole". From the Earth this formation is viewed from the side, limiting the amount of detail that can be seen. The crater is also illuminated at very low angles, so that parts of the interior remain in almost constant darkness. The nearest craters of note are Cabeus to the west, and Shoemaker to the south-southeast and nearer to the south pole of the Moon.

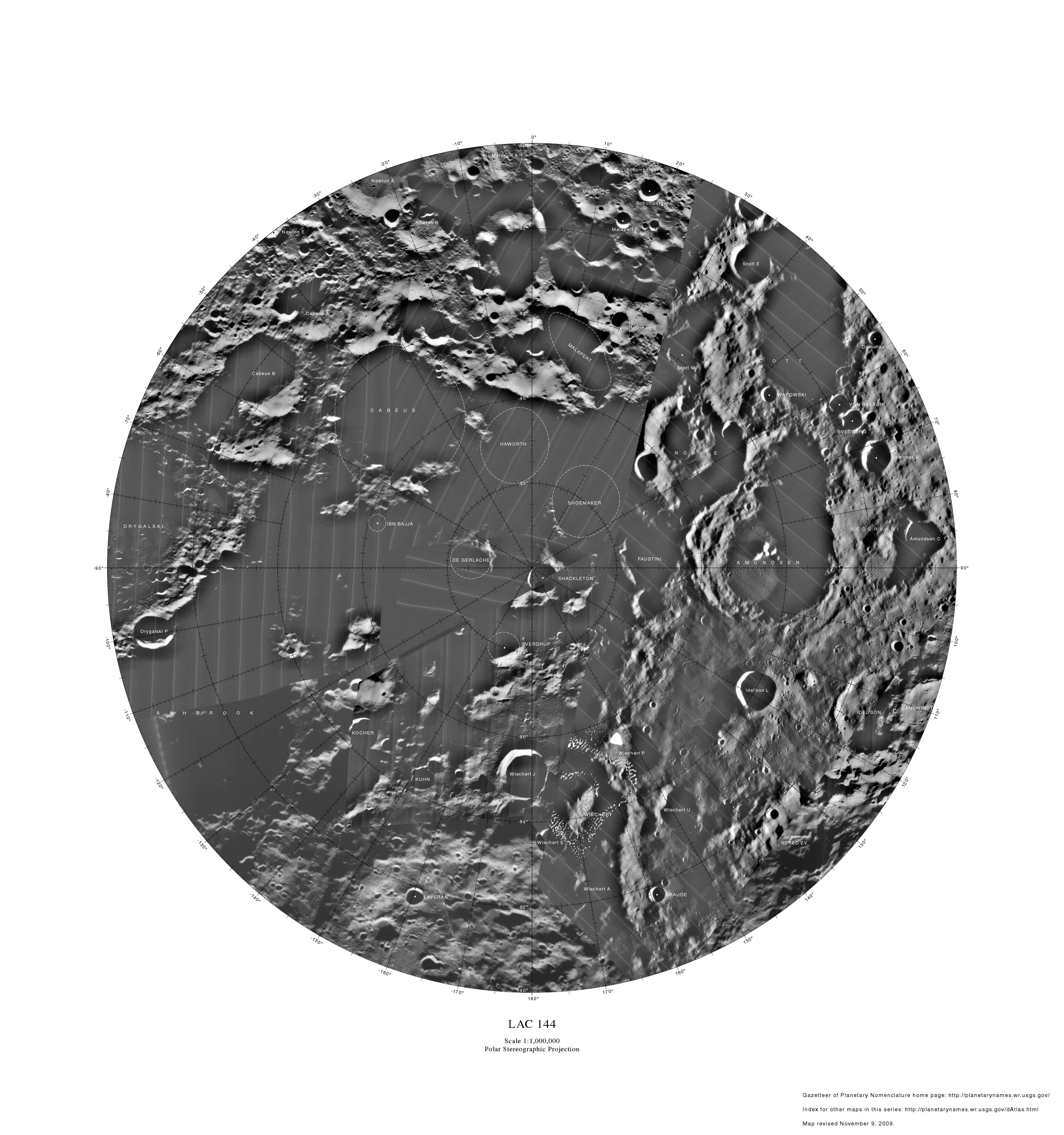
Lunar south polar region map (>80°S).

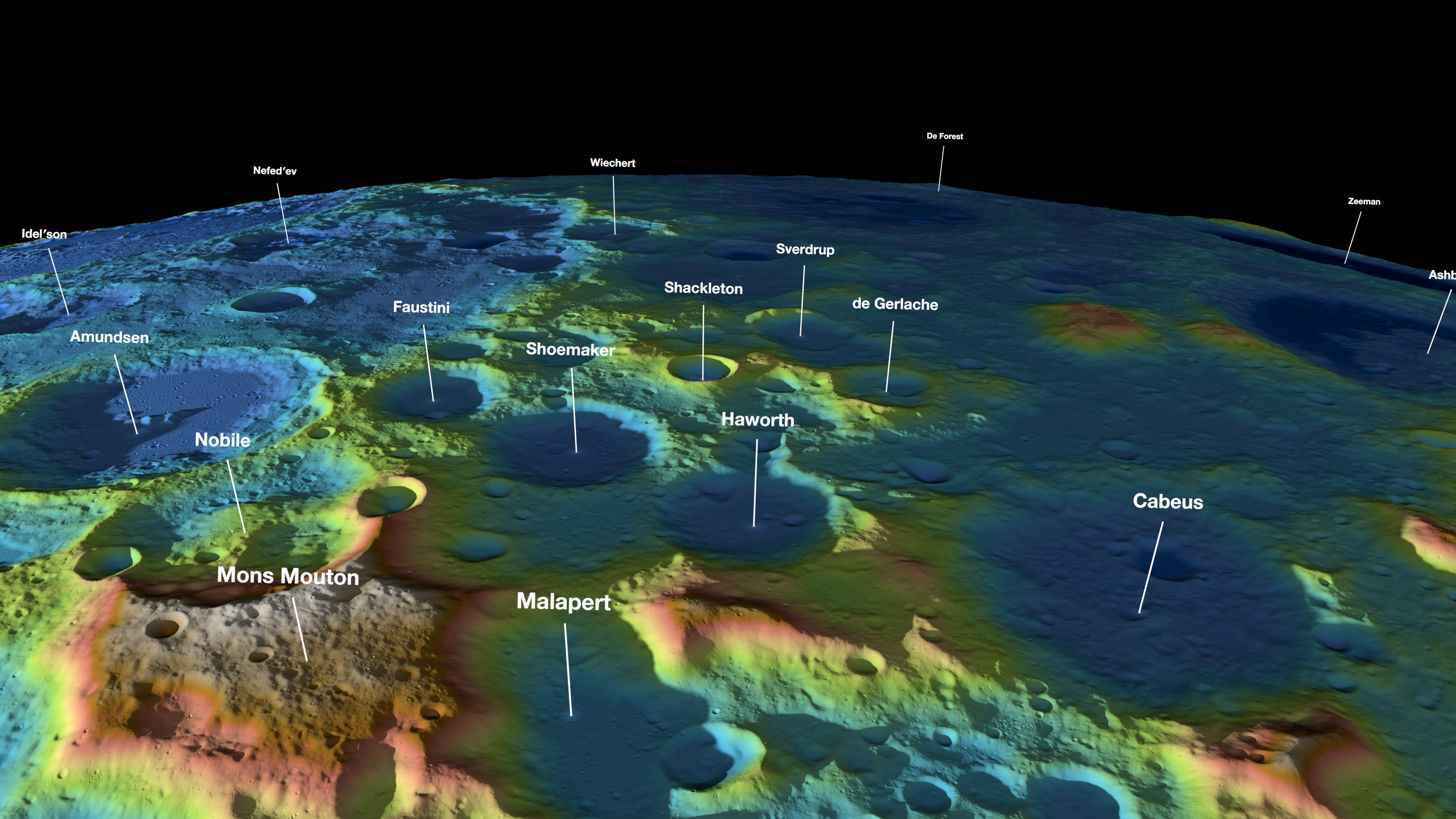
Aerial view of the lunar south polar region with Malapert crater marked.

The rim of Malapert forms an irregular ring of peaks around the interior floor. The western side of the rim is overlain by what appear to be impact craters. There are also small craters overlying the southeastern rim. Much of the interior and details of the rim remain hidden by shadows.

The southwestern part of the rim forms part of a 5-km-high rise in the surface that has been unofficially designated Malapert Mountain. This ridge appears wider along a line running roughly east–west, although details of the back side are hidden by shadows. The peak of this ridge lies almost exactly along 0° longitude, and it has the unusual attribute of lying within sight of both the Earth and the crater Shackleton at the south pole.

== Mission concepts and plans ==
Due to the location of Malapert Mountain, it has been proposed as the site of a transmitter for an expedition to the south lunar pole. The back side of this ridge also lies within the radio shadow for transmissions from the Earth, and it has been suggested as a site for a radio telescope because the radio noise from Earth would be blocked.

In July 2013, private company Moon Express released details of a mission they were planning for no earlier than 2018. The mission would land two telescopes on the Moon, with the preferred location of Malapert crater, to take advantage of the benefits previously identified by lunar researchers Burton Sharpe and David Schrunk. The equipment would include both a 2 metres (6 ft 7 in) radio telescope as well as an optical telescope. This is the specific mission design of the mission first announced publicly the previous year, in collaboration with the International Lunar Observatory Association (ILOA). As of February 2024 no such mission has yet flown.

This massif was a candidate landing site for the Artemis III mission.

== Intuitive Machines 1 mission ==
The Nova-C lunar lander Odysseus, used for the IM-1 mission, landed near Malapert-A in February 2024. The IM-1 mission targeted the Malapert-A crater, an area about 300 km (190 mi) from the lunar south pole, because it appeared to be a relatively flat and safe place near the pole to land.

== Satellite craters ==
By convention these features are identified on lunar maps by placing the letter on the side of the crater midpoint that is closest to Malapert.

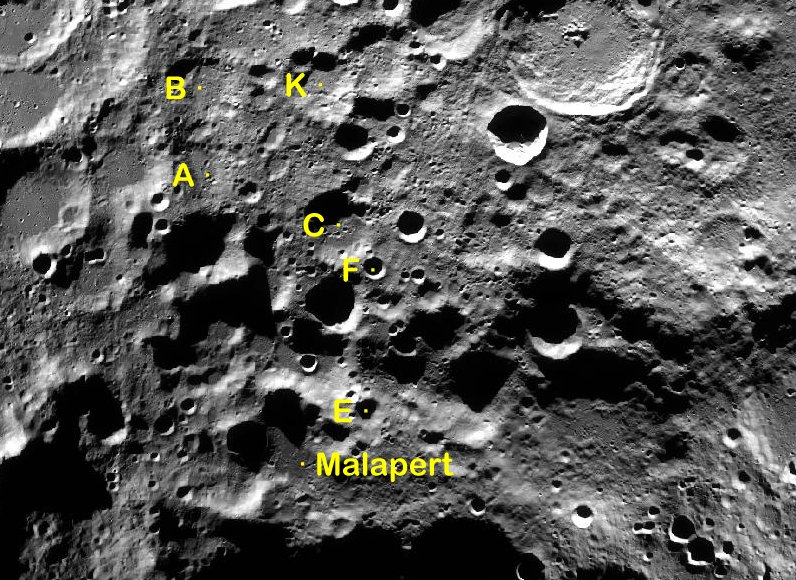
Map showing location of the Malapert "satellite craters."

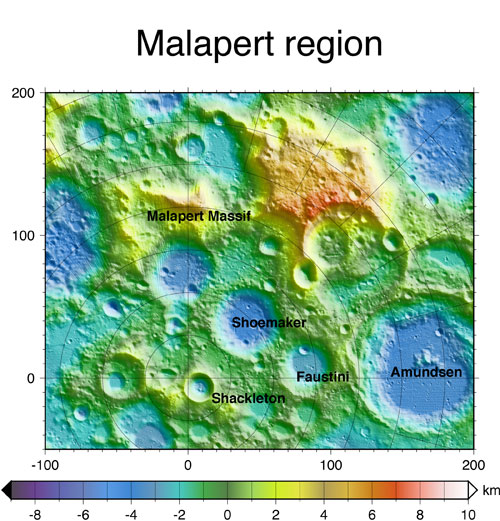
Malapert crater is north to the Malapert massif, the larger highland is the Leibnitz Beta massif.

Malapert	Latitude	Longitude	Diameter
A	80.4° S	3.4° W	24 km
B	79.1° S	2.4° W	37 km
C	81.5° S	10.5° E	40 km
E	84.3° S	21.2° E	17 km
F	81.5° S	14.9° E	11 km
K	78.8° S	6.8° E	36 km

== Images ==
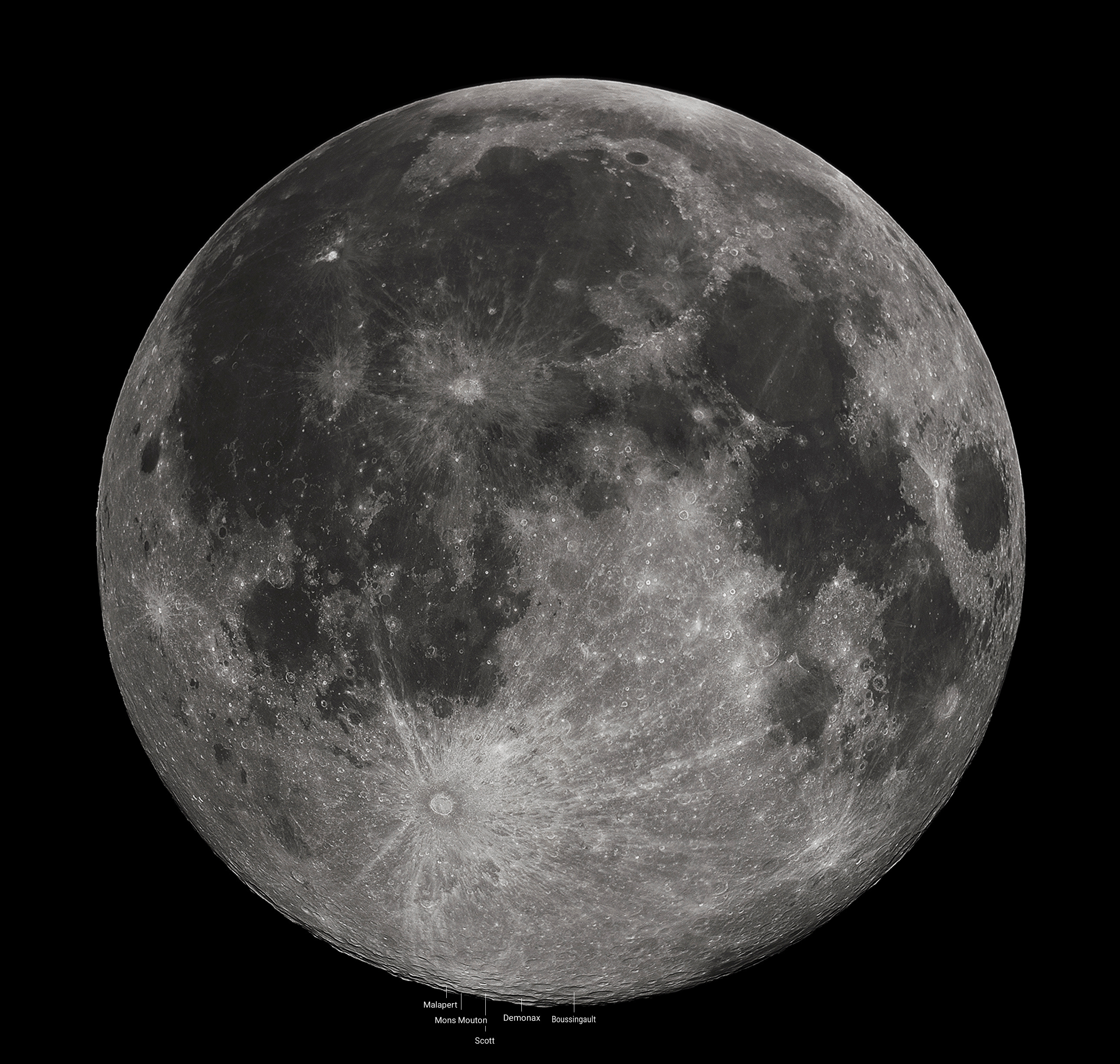
Malapert as viewed from Earth

At a Space Resources Roundtable co-sponsored by the Lunar and Planetary Institute a presentation by B. L. Cooper underscored the difficulty of imaging terrain illuminated by high-incidence-angle light. Nonetheless, the images in her presentation show the Malapert Mountain area well.

== In popular culture ==
In the 1970s British science fiction series Space: 1999, the location of Moonbase Alpha is Malapert Crater.

The International Lunar Observatory (ILO-1) is a lunar-based optical telescope that will be launched after 2022, and will land on the Malapert Mountain ridge.

== See also ==
- Peak of Eternal Light
