= Faustini (crater) =

Lunar impact crater

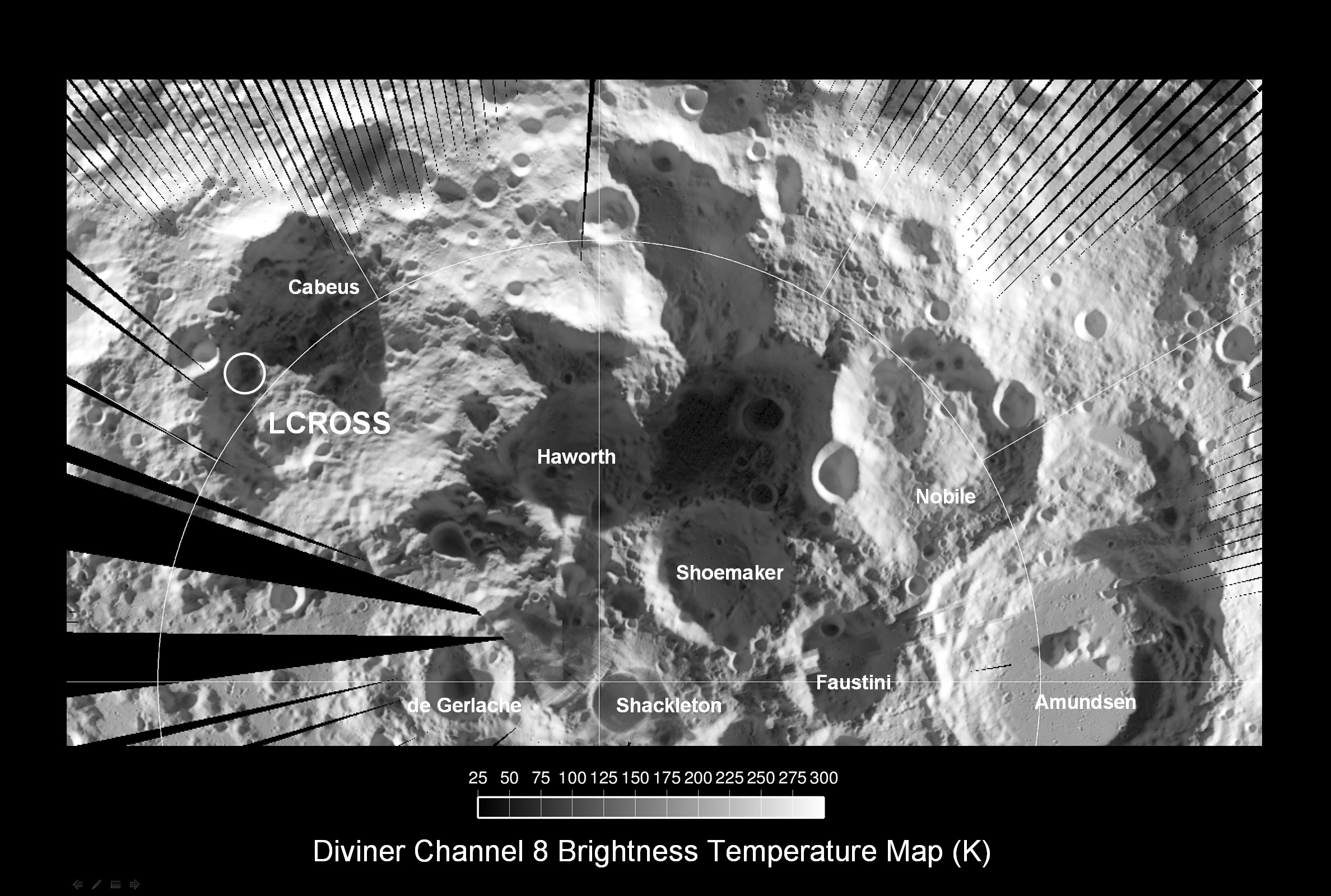
- Faustini Crater as imaged by DLRE. NASA photo.
- Coordinates: 87.3°S 77.0°E
- Diameter: 42.48 km (26.40 mi)
- Depth: Unknown
- Colongitude: 295° at sunrise
- Formation: Pre-Nectarian
- Eponym: Arnaldo Faustini

Faustini is a lunar impact crater that lies near the south pole of the Moon. It dates to the Pre-Nectarian period of the lunar geologic timescale. Because of its ancient age, the floor of Faustini is believed to hold ejecta from the Imbrium, Orientale, and Schrödinger basin impacts. Faustini is located nearly due south of the much larger crater Amundsen, and is almost attached to Shoemaker to the southwest. About one crater diameter due south is the smaller crater Shackleton at the south pole. A small crater is attached to the eastern rim of Faustini.

Due to its location, sunlight reaches the rim of this crater at a very low angle, leaving the interior in permanent darkness. As a result, the crater floor has never been imaged by orbiting spacecraft, although it has been roughly mapped by laser ranging. The lack of illumination by the Sun, the interior remains at a permanent temperature below 100 kelvin, cold enough to trap any water vapor that reaches the crater following comet impacts on the Moon.

The Lunar Prospector spacecraft carried a neutron spectrometer that could be used to detect the presence of large concentrations of hydrogen. The cold trap within Faustini was identified as having a high concentration of hydrogen, relative to the norm for the lunar surface. However, radar observations of this crater failed to detect ice. A 2026 study by Gujarat University and ISRO scientists combined archival data from the Mini-SAR instrument of Chandrayaan-1 and the DFSAR instrument on the Chandrayaan-2 orbiter to identify subsurface water ice in the Faustini crater.

This formation is named after Italian polar explorer Arnaldo Faustini (1874-1944). Its designation was officially adopted by the International Astronomical Union in 1994.
