= Lunar south pole =

Southernmost point on the Moon

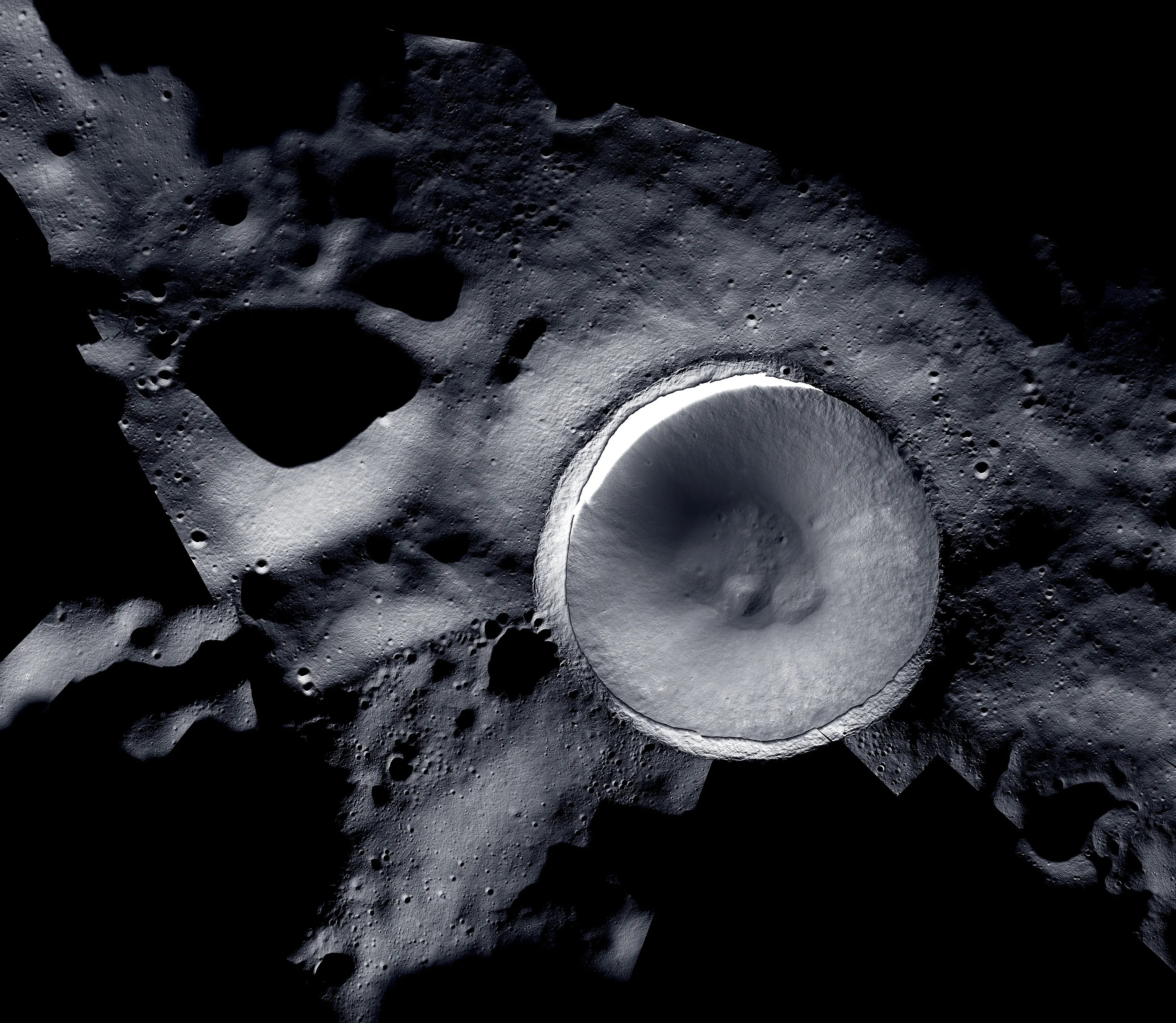
The lunar south pole at the center of this image, situated on the rim of Shackleton Crater. Mosaic image created by LROC (Lunar Reconnaissance Orbiter) and ShadowCam

A view of the south pole of the Moon showing where reflectance and temperature data indicate the possible presence of surface water ice

The lunar south pole is the southernmost point on the Moon. It is of interest to scientists because of the occurrence of water ice in permanently shadowed areas around it. The lunar south pole region features craters that are unique in that the near-constant sunlight does not reach their interior. Such craters are cold traps that contain fossil records of hydrogen, water, ice, and other volatiles dating from the early Solar System. In contrast, the lunar north pole region exhibits a much lower quantity of similarly sheltered craters.

== Geography ==
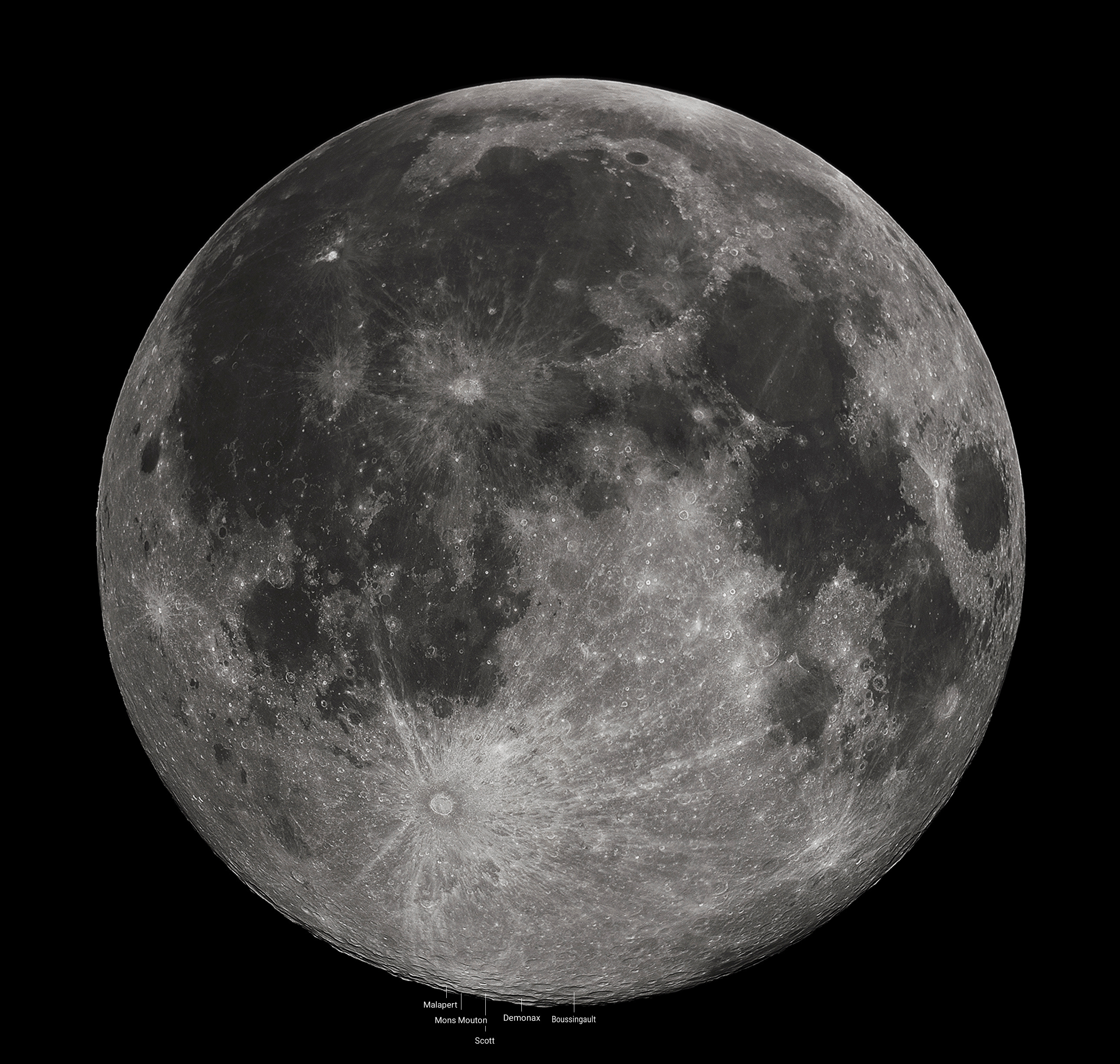
Full Moon with south polar region features marked

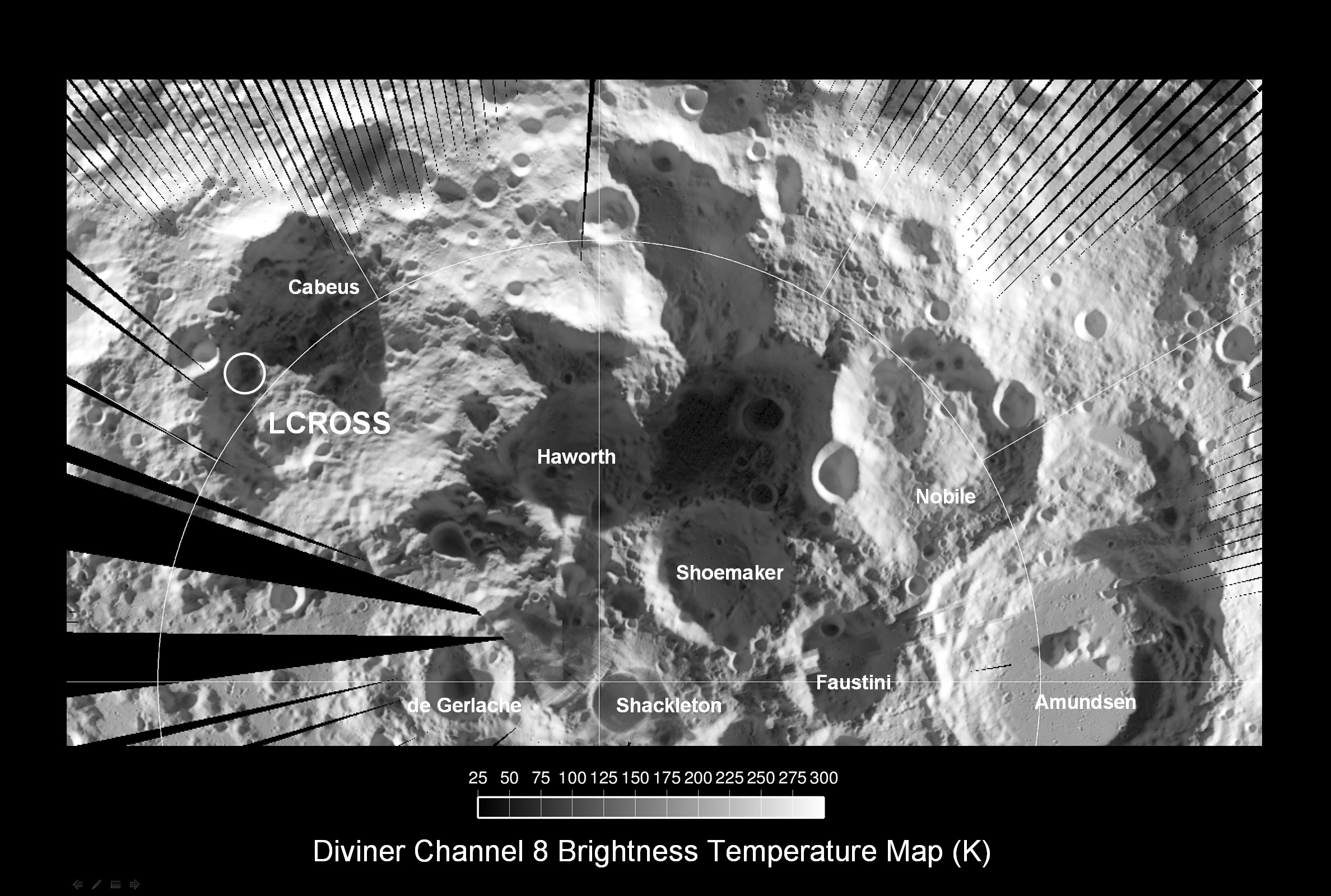
The several hundred kilometer wide Lunar south polar region as illuminated by the Sun during summer. The south pole lies at the rim of Shackleton crater. The region is shadowed by the well illuminated Leibnitz plateau, flanked on the right by the Nobile crater and to the left by the partly shadowed Malapert crater and its Malapert peak illuminated at the rim of Haworth crater.

The lunar south pole is located on the center of the polar Antarctic Circle (80°S to 90°S). (The axis spin is 88.5 degrees from the plane of the ecliptic.) The lunar south pole has shifted 5.5 degrees from its original position billions of years ago. This shift has changed the rotational axis of the Moon, allowing sunlight to reach previously shadowed areas, but the south pole still features some completely shadowed areas. Conversely, the pole also contains areas with permanent exposure to sunlight. The south pole region features many craters and basins such as the South Pole–Aitken basin, which appears to be one of the most fundamental features of the Moon, and mountains, such as Epsilon Peak at 9.050 km, taller than any mountain found on Earth. The south pole temperature averages approximately 260 K (−13 °C; 8 °F).

=== Craters ===
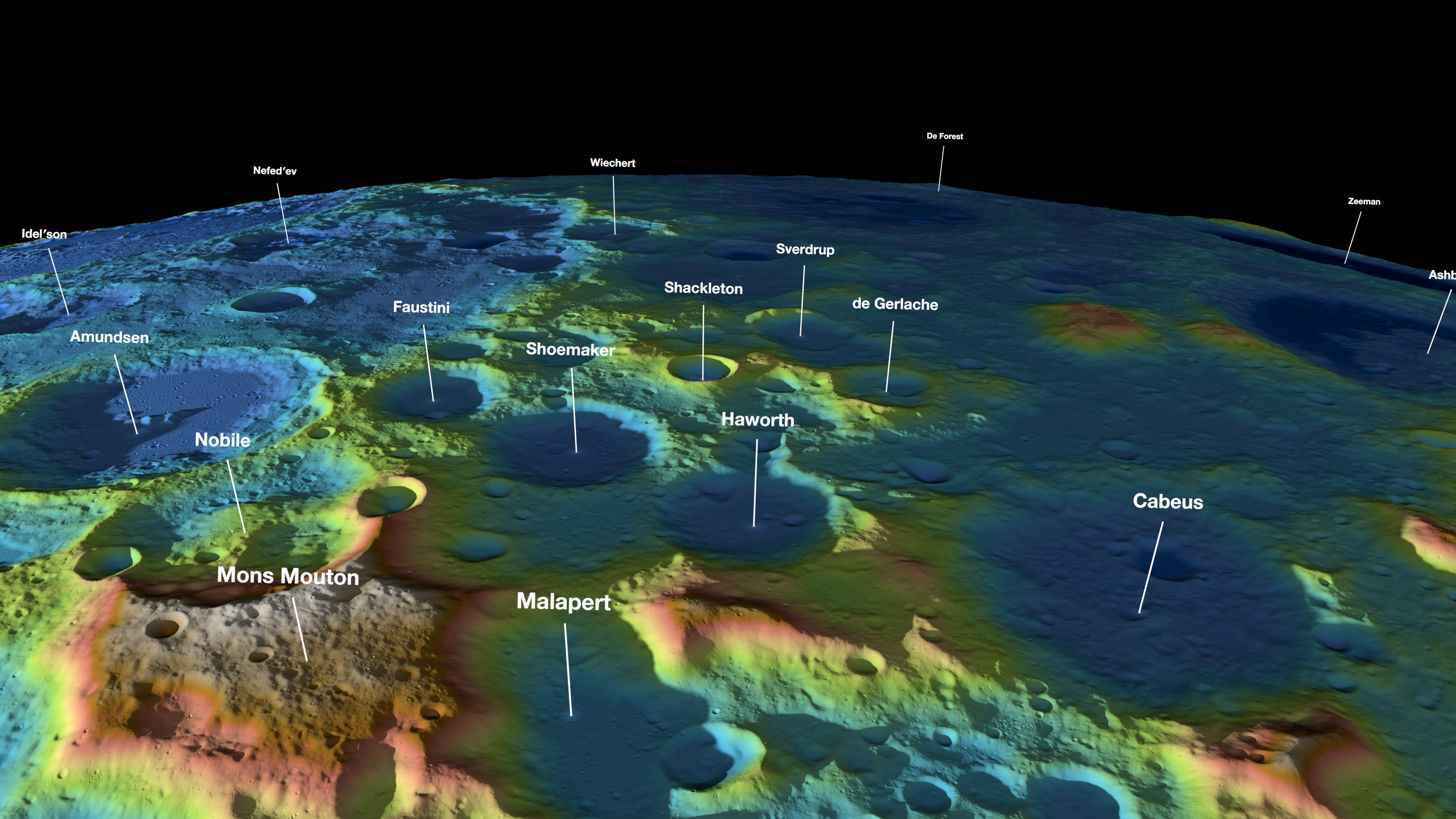
Aerial view of the polar region craters with elevation colouring

The pole defined by the rotational axis of the Moon lies within Shackleton Crater. Notable craters nearest to the lunar south pole include de Gerlache, Sverdrup, Shoemaker, Faustini, Haworth, Nobile, and Cabeus.

== Discoveries ==
=== Illumination ===
NASA simulation of the lunar south pole illumination in 2025 in steps of 2 hours. The teal rings are in steps of 2° ≈ 60.6 km (37.7 mi).

The lunar south pole features a region with crater rims exposed to near-constant solar illumination, yet the interior of the craters are permanently shaded from sunlight. The area's illumination was studied using high-resolution digital models produced from data by the Lunar Reconnaissance Orbiter. The lunar surface can also reflect solar wind as energetic neutral atoms. On average, 16% of these atoms have been protons that vary based on location. These atoms have created an integral flux of backscattered hydrogen atoms due to the reflected amount of plasma that exists on the surface of the Moon. They also reveal the line boundary and the magnetic dynamics within the regions of these neutral atoms on the Moon's surface.

=== Cold traps ===
Cold traps are some of the important places on the lunar south pole region in terms of possible water ice and other volatile deposits. Cold traps can contain water and ice that were originally from comets, meteorites and solar wind-induced iron reduction. From experiments and sample readings, scientists were able to confirm that cold traps contain ice. Hydroxyl has also been found in these cold traps. The discovery of these two compounds has led to the funding of missions focusing primarily on the lunar poles using global-scale infrared detection. The ice stays in these traps because of the thermal behavior of the Moon that is controlled by thermophysical properties such as scattered sunlight, thermal re-radiation, internal heat and light given off by the Earth.

=== Magnetic surface ===
There are areas of the Moon where the crust is magnetized. This is known as a magnetic anomaly due to the remnants of metal iron that was emplaced by the impactor that formed the South Pole–Aitken basin (SPA basin). However, the concentration of iron that is thought to be in the basin was not present in the mappings, as they could be too deep in the Moon's crust for the mappings to detect. Alternatively, the magnetic anomaly may be caused by another factor that does not involve metallic properties. The findings were proven inadequate due to the inconsistencies between the maps that were used, and also, they were not able to detect the magnitude of the magnetic fluctuations at the Moon's surface.

== Exploration ==
=== Missions ===
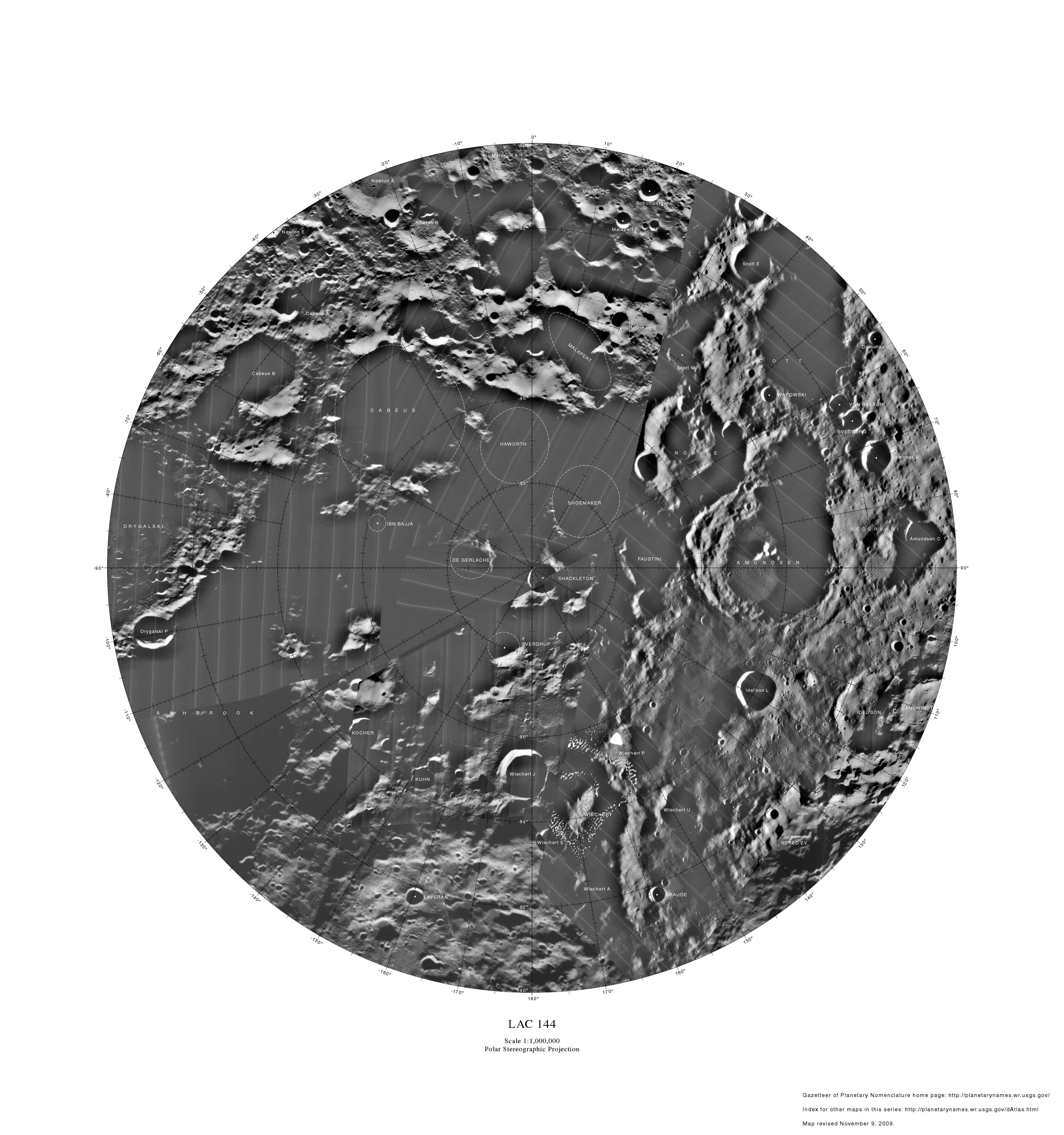
Lunar south polar region map (>80°S)

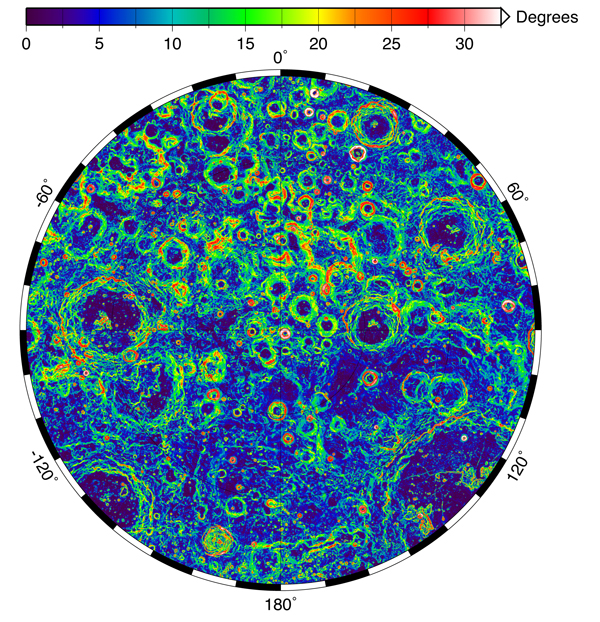
Degree of the slopes found within 15 degrees of the south pole of the Moon

Orbiters from several countries have explored the region around the lunar south pole. Extensive studies were conducted by the Lunar Orbiters, Clementine, Lunar Prospector, Lunar Reconnaissance Orbiter, Kaguya, and Chandrayaan-1, that discovered the presence of lunar water. NASA's LCROSS mission found a significant amount of water in the Cabeus crater. The LCROSS mission deliberately crashed into the floor of Cabeus and from samples found that it contained nearly 5% water. ISRO's Chandrayaan 3 became the first lander to land near the lunar south pole region.

=== Lunar Reconnaissance Orbiter ===
The Lunar Reconnaissance Orbiter (LRO) was launched by NASA on 18 June 2009 and is still mapping the lunar south pole region. This mission has helped scientists see if the lunar south pole region has enough sustainable resources to sustain a permanent crewed station. The LRO carries the Diviner Lunar Radiometer Experiment, which investigates the radiation and thermophysical properties of the south pole surface. It can detect reflected solar radiation and internal infrared emissions. The LRO Diviner is able to detect where water ice could be trapped on the surface.

=== LCROSS ===
The Lunar Crater Observation and Sensing Satellite (LCROSS) was a robotic spacecraft operated by NASA. The mission was conceived as a low-cost means of determining the nature of hydrogen detected at the polar regions of the Moon. Launched immediately after discovery of lunar water by Chandrayaan-1, the main LCROSS mission objective was to further explore the presence of water in the form of ice in a permanently shadowed crater near a lunar polar region. It was launched together with the Lunar Reconnaissance Orbiter (LRO) and its Centaur Upper stage. It was successful in confirming water in the southern lunar crater Cabeus.

=== Moon Impact Probe ===
The Moon Impact Probe (MIP) developed by the Indian Space Research Organisation (ISRO), India's national space agency, was a lunar probe that was released by ISRO's Chandrayaan-1 lunar remote sensing orbiter which was launched, on 22 October 2008. The Moon Impact Probe separated from the Moon-orbiting Chandrayaan-1 on 14 November 2008, 20:06 IST and after nearly 25 minutes crashed as planned, near the rim of the crater Shackleton. With this mission India became the first to hard land or impact on the lunar South Pole.

=== Luna 25 ===
Russia launched its Luna 25 lunar lander on 10 August 2023. Luna-25 spent five days journeying to the Moon, then was circling the natural satellite for another five to seven days. The spacecraft then was planned to be set down in the Moon's south polar region, near the crater Boguslawsky. Luna developed an "emergency situation" that occurred during the reduction of the probe to a pre-landing orbit. The lunar lander abruptly lost communication at 2:57 p.m. (11:57 GMT). Luna 25 was a lander only, with a primary mission of proving the landing technology. The mission was carrying 30 kg (66 lb) of scientific instruments, including a robotic arm for soil samples and possible drilling hardware. The launch took place on a Soyuz-2.1b rocket with Fregat upper stage, from Vostochny Cosmodrome.

=== Chandrayaan-3 ===
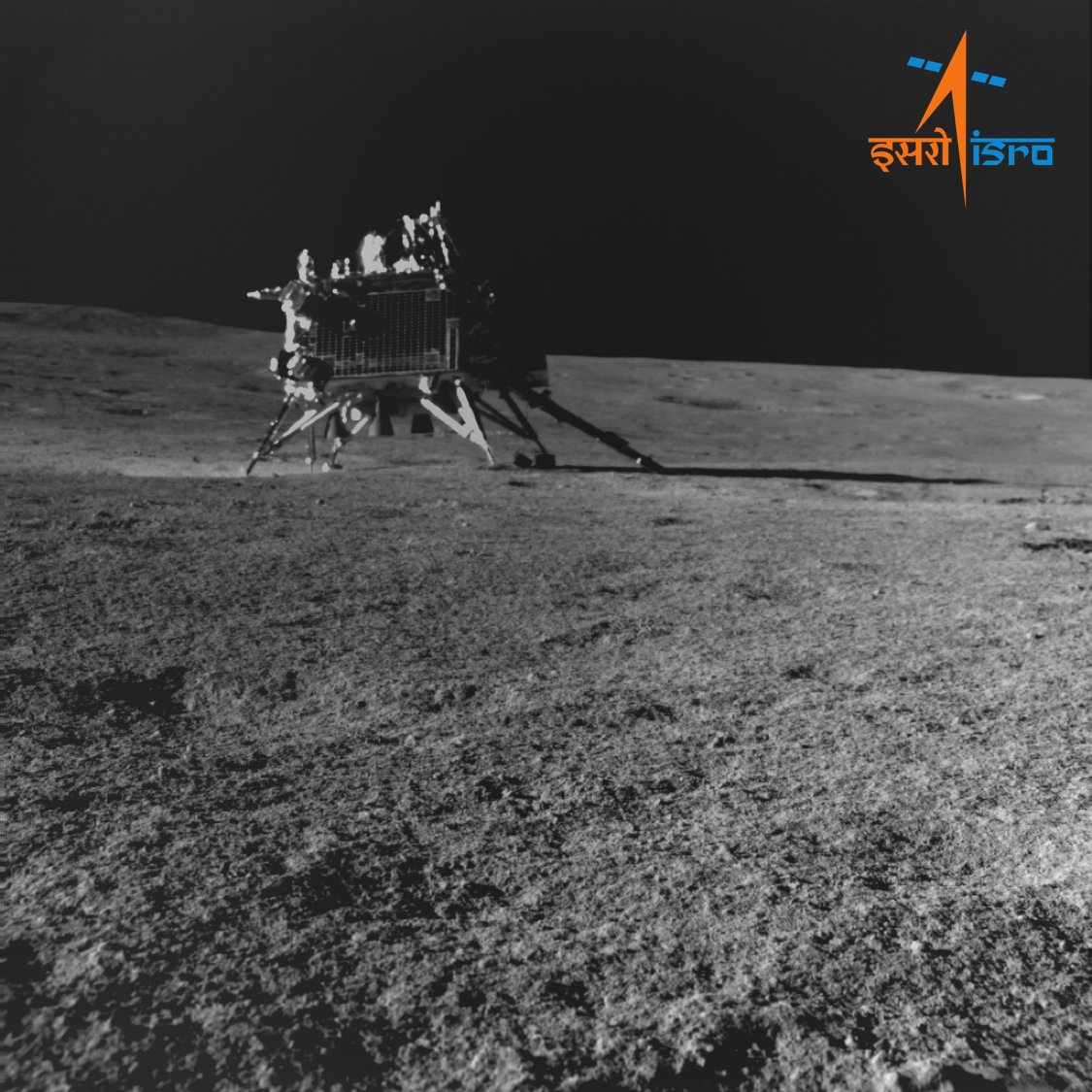
India's Chandrayaan-3 (2023) became the first lunar mission to achieve a soft landing near the lunar south pole.

On 23 August 2023, 12:34 UTC, India's Chandrayaan-3 became the first lunar mission to achieve a soft landing near the lunar south pole. The mission consisted of a lander and a rover for carrying out scientific experiments.

=== IM-1 ===
The IM-1 Odysseus lander took about six days to travel from the Earth to the Moon. Once in the vicinity of the Moon, the lander spent approximately one more Earth-day orbiting the Moon. This set 22 February 2024 at 11:24 PM UTC as the lander's lunar landing date. The initial aim was to land within the Malapert-A crater, which is about 300 km (190 mi) from the lunar south pole. Later, the exact time of landing was announced as 11:24 PM UTC. Odysseus became the first US Moon landing in the 21st century.

==== EagleCam to record lunar landing ====
Just before landing, at approximately 30 m (98 ft) above the lunar surface, the Odysseus lander was planned to eject the EagleCam camera-equipped CubeSat, which would have been dropped onto the lunar surface near the lander, with an impact velocity of about 10 m/s (22 mph). However, due to complications arising from a software patch, it was decided that EagleCam would not be ejected upon landing. It was later ejected on 28 February but was partially a failure as it returned all types of data, except post IM-1 landing images that were the main aim of its mission.

=== IM-2 ===
Intuitive Machines's lunar lander IM-2, carrying NASA-sponsored experiments and commercial rovers (Yaoki, AstroAnt, Micro-Nova and MAPP LV1) and payloads as a part of Commercial Lunar Payload Services program to Mons Mouton, was launched on 27 February 2025 on a Falcon 9 launch vehicle with Brokkr-2 and Lunar Trailblazer. IM-2 landed on 6 March 2025. The spacecraft was intact after touchdown but resting on its side, thereby complicating its planned science and technology demonstration mission; this outcome is similar to what occurred with the company's IM-1 Odysseus spacecraft in 2024. On 13 March, Intuitive Machines shared that, like on the IM-1 mission, the Athena's altimeter had failed during landing, leaving its onboard computer without an accurate altitude reading. As a result, the spacecraft struck a plateau, tipped over, and skidded across the lunar surface, rolling once or twice before settling inside the crater. The company's CEO compared it to a baseball player sliding into a base. During the slide, the spacecraft rolled once or twice, before coming to rest inside the crater. The impact also kicked up regolith that coated the solar panels in dust, degrading their performance.

=== Role in future exploration and observations ===
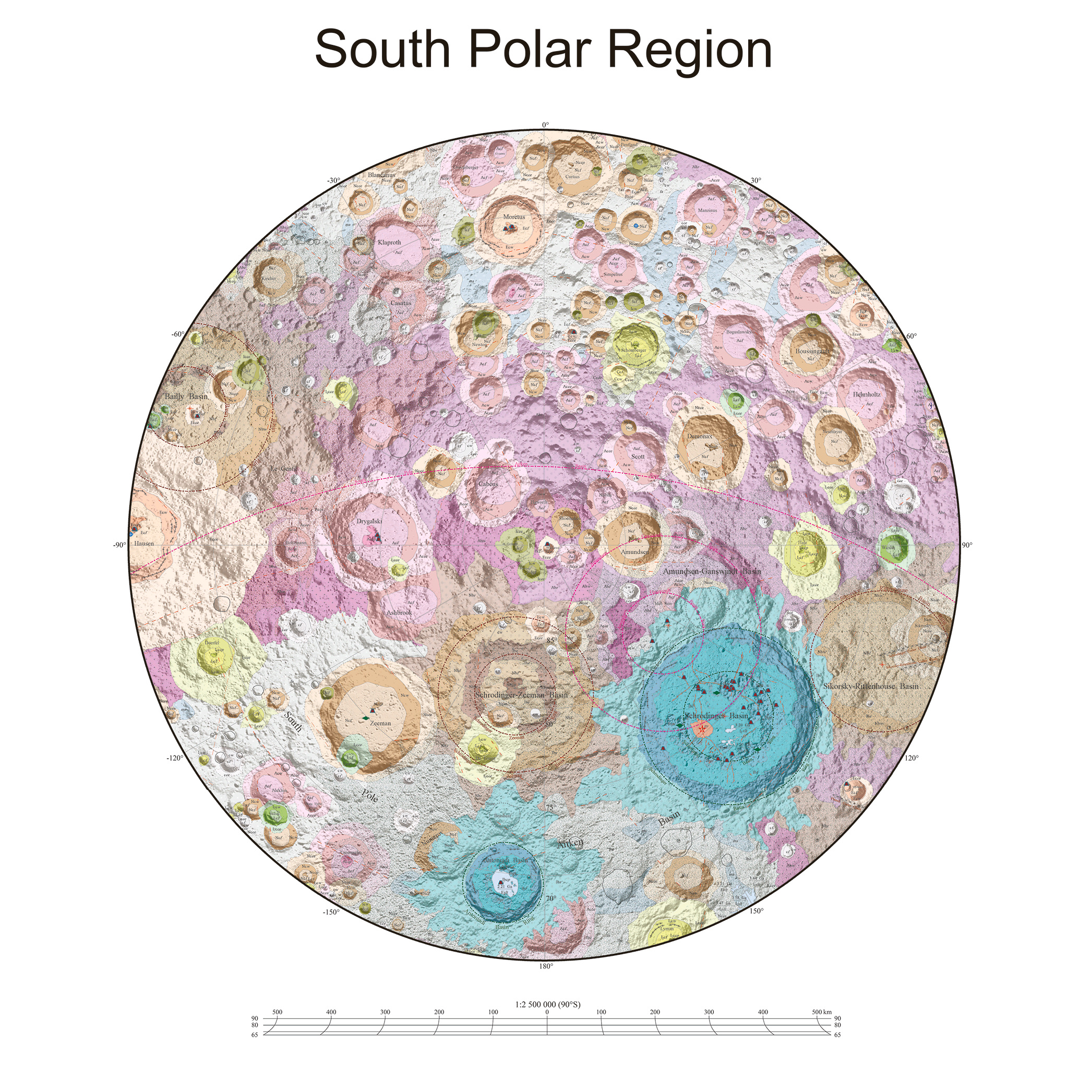
Geological map of the lunar south pole region

The lunar south pole region is deemed to be a compelling place for future exploration missions and suitable for a lunar outpost. The permanently shadowed places on the Moon could contain ice and other minerals, which would be vital resources for future explorers. The mountain peaks near the pole are illuminated for large periods of time and could be used to provide solar energy to an outpost. With an outpost on the Moon, scientists will be able to analyze water and other volatile samples dating to the formation of the Solar System.

Scientists used LOLA (Lunar Orbiter Laser Altimeter), which was a device used by NASA to provide an accurate topographic model of the Moon. With this data, locations near the south pole at Connecting Ridge, which connects Shackleton to the crater de Gerlache, were found that yielded sunlight for 92.27–95.65% of the time based on altitude ranging from 2 m above ground to 10 m above ground. At the same spots it was discovered that the longest continuous periods of darkness were only 3 to 5 days.

The lunar south pole is a place where scientists may be able to perform unique astronomical observations of radio waves under 30 MHz. The Chinese Longjiang microsatellites were launched in May 2018 to orbit the Moon, and Longjiang-2 operated in this frequency until 31 July 2019. Before Longjiang-2, no space observatory had observed astronomical radio waves in this frequency because of interference waves from equipment on Earth. The lunar south pole has mountains and basins, such as the south side of Malapert Mountain, that do not face Earth and would be ideal to receive such astronomical radio signals from a ground radio observatory.

=== Resources ===
Lunar surface chemical composition
Compound	Formula	Composition	
Compound	Formula	Maria	Highlands
silica	SiO_{2}	45.4%	45.5%
alumina	Al_{2}O_{3}	14.9%	24.0%
lime	CaO	11.8%	15.9%
iron(II) oxide	FeO	14.1%	5.9%
magnesia	MgO	9.2%	7.5%
titanium dioxide	TiO_{2}	3.9%	0.6%
sodium oxide	Na_{2}O	0.6%	0.6%
Total		99.9%	100.0%

Solar power, oxygen, and metals are abundant resources in the south polar region. By locating a lunar resource processing facility near the south pole, solar-generated electrical power will allow for nearly constant operation. Elements known to be present on the lunar surface include, among others, hydrogen (H), oxygen (O), silicon (Si), iron (Fe), magnesium (Mg), calcium (Ca), aluminium (Al), manganese (Mn) and titanium (Ti). Among the more abundant are oxygen, iron and silicon. The oxygen content is estimated at 45% (by weight).

=== Future ===
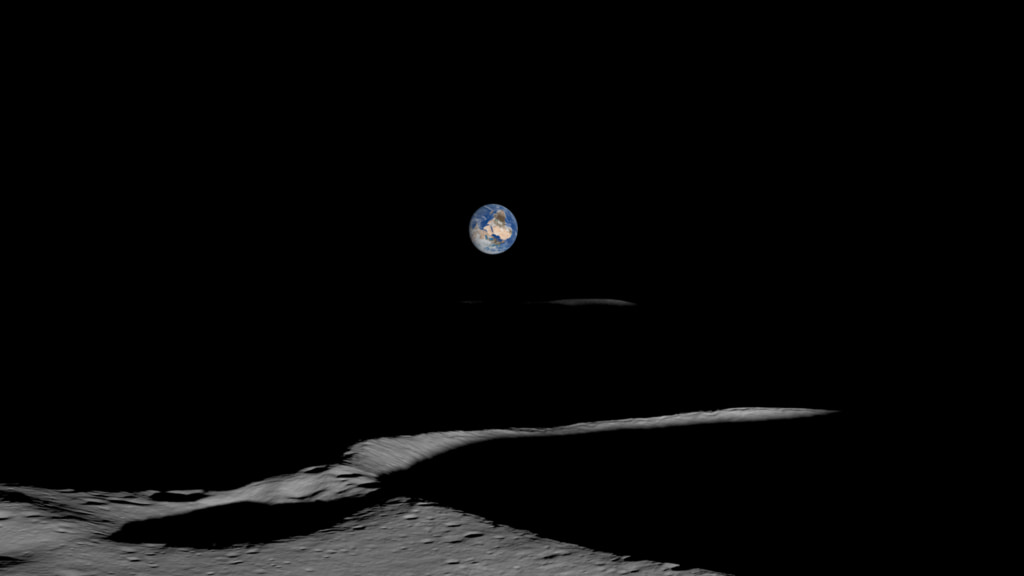
A simulated view of Earth from the vicinity of Shackleton Crater, visible as a thin illuminated rim

CNSA and CMSA are planning to launch the Chang'e 7 mission in August 2026, which targets a landing at Shackleton Crater in the south polar region in November 2026. Its unique hopping probe would proceed a ice search in the permanently shadowed crater. Blue Origin is planning the Blue Moon Pathfinder Mission 1 also to the Shackleton Crater in 2026. The Blue Moon lander derives from the vertical landing technology used in Blue Origin's New Shepard sub-orbital rocket. This could lead to a series of missions landing equipment for a crewed base in a south polar region crater using their Blue Moon lander.

Besides Blue origin's effort, NASA's Artemis program has proposed to land several extra robotic landers and rovers (CLPS) in preparation for the planned late-2020s Artemis IV crewed landing at the south polar region.

== See also ==
- Face on Moon South Pole
- Geology of the Moon
- Lunar north pole
- Lunar resources
- Selenography
