= Rim (crater) =

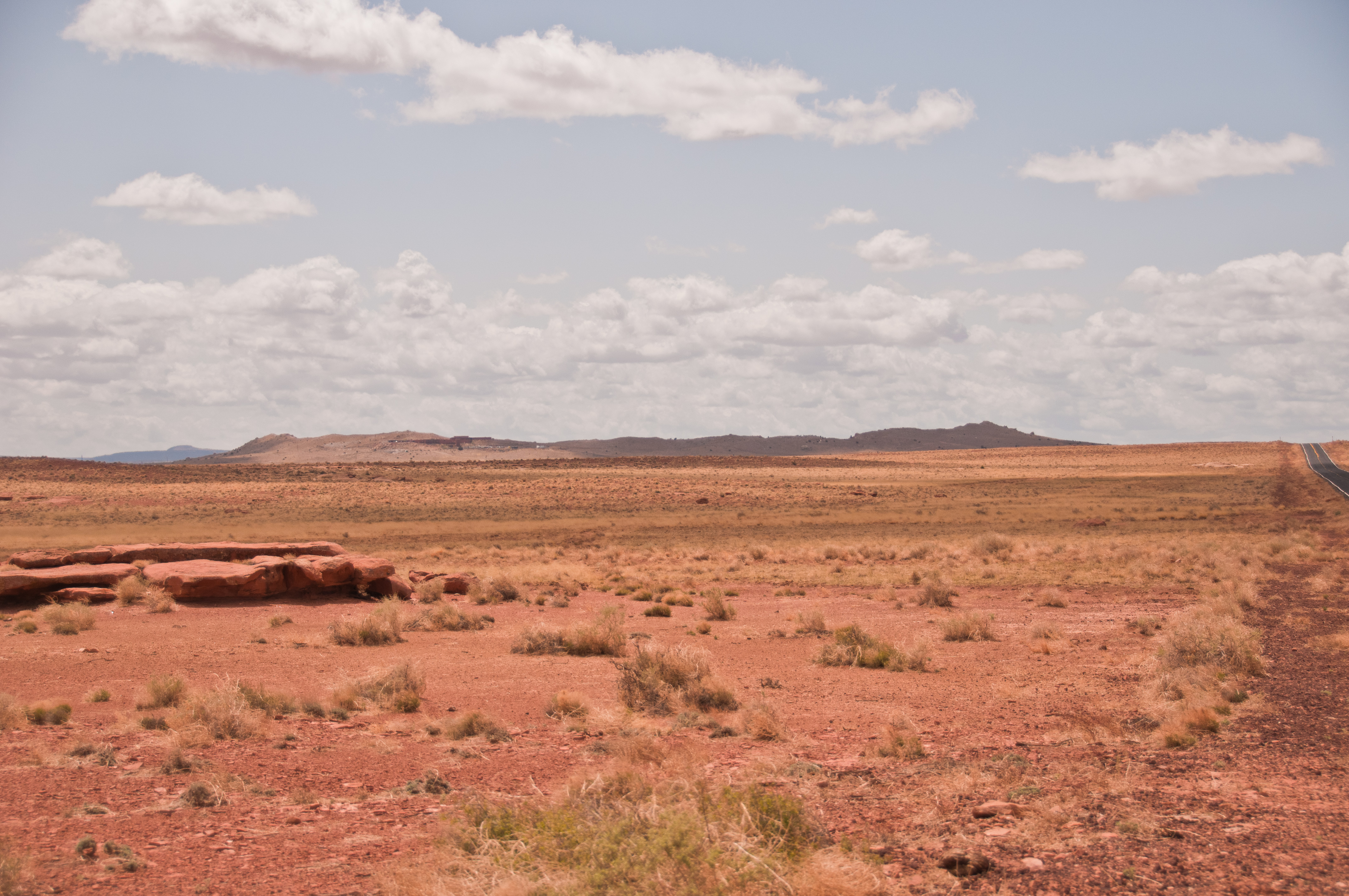
Crater rim of Meteor Crater, Arizona

The rim or edge of an impact crater is the part that extends above the height of the local surface, usually in a circular or elliptical pattern. In a more specific sense, the rim may refer to the circular or elliptical edge that represents the uppermost tip of this raised portion. If there is no raised portion, the rim simply refers to the inside edge of the curve where the flat surface meets the curve of the crater bottom.

== Simple craters ==
Smaller, simple craters retain rim geometries similar to the features of many craters found on the Moon and the planet Mercury.

== Complex craters ==
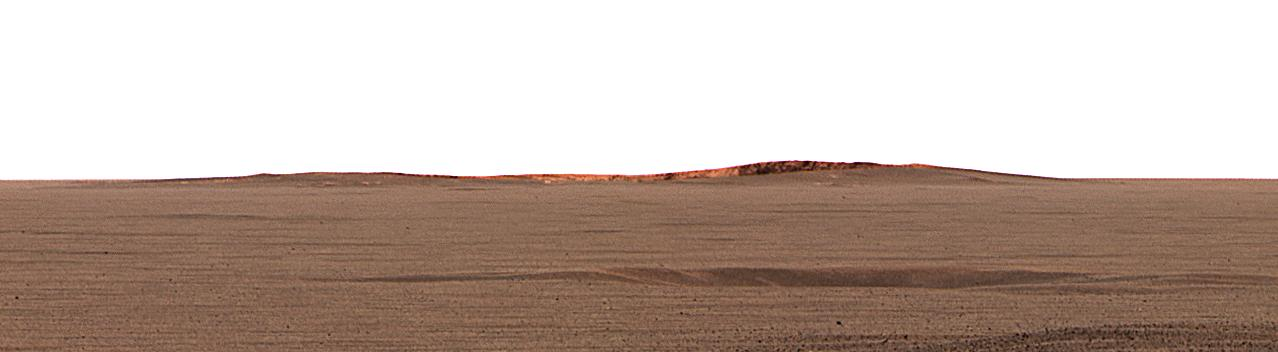
The rim of Endurance Crater on Mars, as seen from the landing site of the Opportunity rover.

Large craters are those with a diameter greater than 2.3 km, and are distinguished by central uplifts within the impact zone. These larger (also called “complex”) craters can form rims up to several hundred meters in height.

A process to consider when determining the exact height of a crater rim is that melt may have been pushed over the crest of the initial rim from the initial impact, thereby increasing its overall height. When combined with potential weathering due to atmospheric erosion over time, determining the average height of a crater rim can be somewhat difficult. It has also been observed that the slope along the excavated interior of many craters can facilitate a spur-and-gully morphology, including mass wasting events occurring due to slope instability and nearby seismic activity.

Complex crater rims observed on Earth have anywhere between 5X – 8X greater height:diameter ratio compared to those observed on the Moon, which can likely be attributed to the greater force of gravitational acceleration between the two planetary bodies that collide. Additionally, crater depth and the volume of melt produced in the impact are directly related to the gravitational acceleration between the two bodies. It has been proposed that “reverse faulting and thrusting at the final crater rim [is] one of the main contributing factors [to] forming the elevated crater rim”. When an impact crater is formed on a sloped surface, the rim will form in an asymmetric profile. As the impacted surface's angle of repose increases, the crater's profile becomes more elongate.

== Classification ==
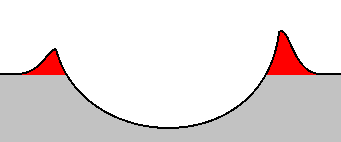
A side view of a crater, with a raised rim, highlighted in red.

The rim type classifications are full-rim craters, broken-rim craters, and depressions.
