= Crater depth =

Depth of an impact crater

The depth of an impact crater in a solid planet or moon may be measured from the local surface to the bottom of the crater, or from the rim of the crater to the bottom.

Crater depth diagram

The diagram above shows the full (side) view of a typical crater. Depth "A" measures from the surface to the bottom of the crater. Depth "B" measures from the mean height of the rim to the bottom of the crater.

== Concepts and Measurement ==
Using the following concepts, a crater is measured:

- Measurement
- Scales
- Geometry
- Graphing data
- Drawing conclusions

A method of measuring a crater is to find the length of the shadow cast by the crater's rim and the angle at which the light source enters. In this measurement, use the geometry of triangles to calculate d (shadow depth) using L (shadow length) and Ø (shadow angle). So, tan Ø = d/L and L * tan Ø = d
