= Discovery 3 =

Discovery 3 may refer to:

- Land Rover Discovery 3, a second-generation Discovery SUV car model by Land Rover.
- Lunar Prospector, the third mission of the Discovery program.
