= Lunar rover =

Vehicle that travels on the Moon's surface

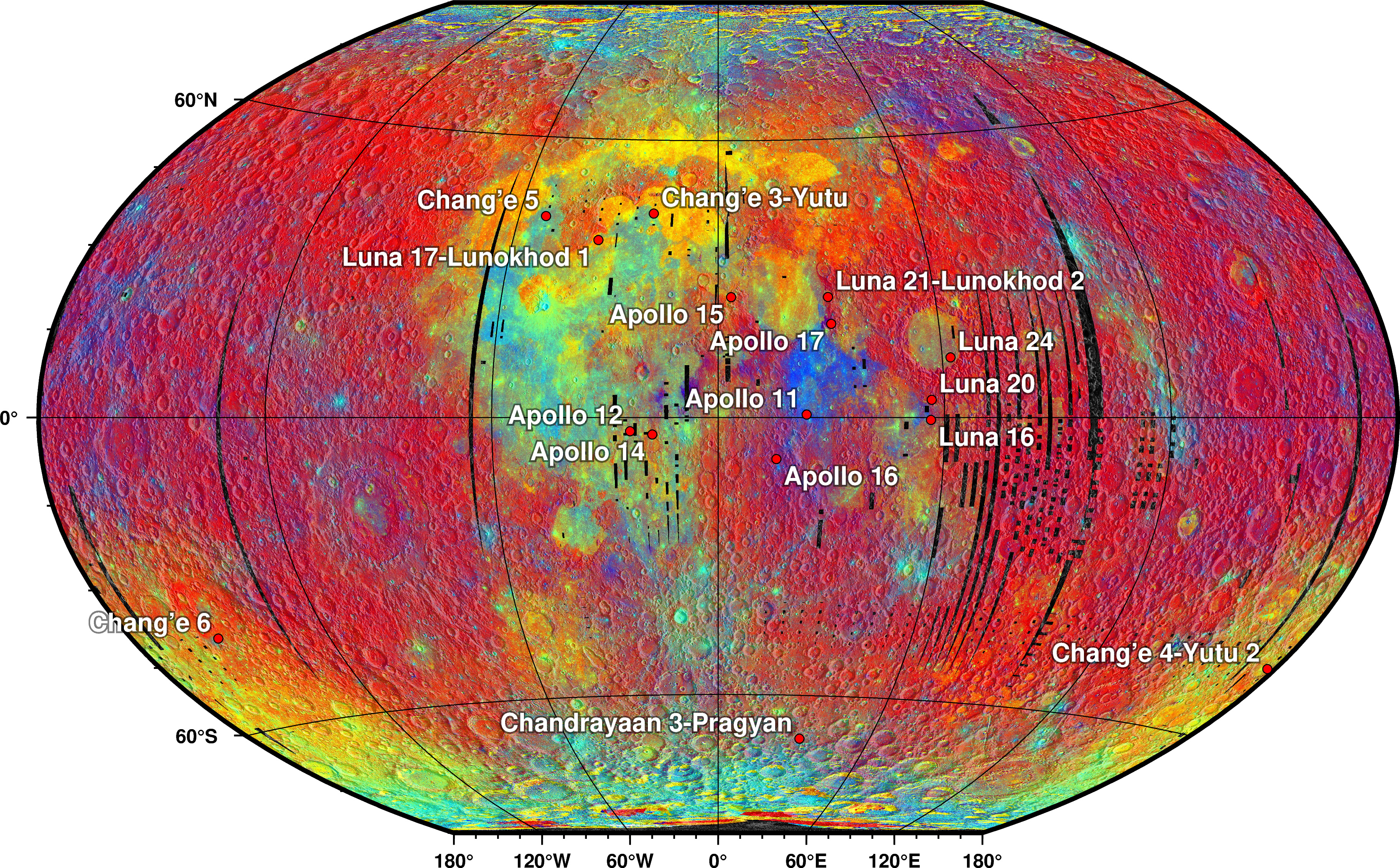
Landing sites of sample return and rover missions superimposed on lithology (Clementine UVVIS). Red: old lunar highlands. Blue: young lunar highlands. Yellow: lunar maria (high titanium). Cyan: lunar maria (low titanium)

A lunar rover or Moon rover is a space exploration vehicle designed to move across the surface of the Moon. The Apollo program's Lunar Roving Vehicle was driven on the Moon by members of three American crews, Apollo 15, 16, and 17. Other rovers have been partially or fully autonomous robots, such as the Soviet Union's Lunokhods, Chinese Yutus, Indian Pragyan, and Japan's LEVs. Five countries have had operating rovers on the Moon: the Soviet Union, the United States, China, India, and Japan.

== Variations in design ==
Lunar rover designs have varied in several ways.

=== Size and speed ===
Lunokhod rovers were 170 centimetres (67 in) in length. The LRVs were 10 ft (3.0 m) long with a 7.5 ft (2.3 m) wheelbase, and achieved a top speed of 11.2 miles per hour (18.0 km/h) during Apollo 17.

=== Power ===
The Lunokhod rovers, and others, used photovoltaic solar power. The LRV rovers were battery powered. Lunokhod and the Chinese Yutu rovers were furthermore equipped with a radioisotope heater unit to keep instruments warm. These, however, delivered only heat, not electric power. While unlike on other celestial bodies, such as Earth or Mars, there is no atmosphere to interfere with solar power, the extreme length of the day/night cycle complicates the use of solar power as energy storage or hibernation are necessary for any missions exceeding two weeks in length. There are places where solar power is almost always available (especially near the lunar south pole) on the Moon, but to date no mission has successfully landed a rover at one of those places. Radioisotope thermoelectric generators can operate independent of the day/night cycle and have been used on missions to other celestial bodies in the past.

=== Propulsion ===
The LRV was a four-wheel design. The Lunokhod rovers used eight.

=== Thermal control ===
To remain warm during periods of lunar night the Lunokhod rovers used heat from radioactive polonium-210.

== Past missions ==
=== Lunokhod 1 ===
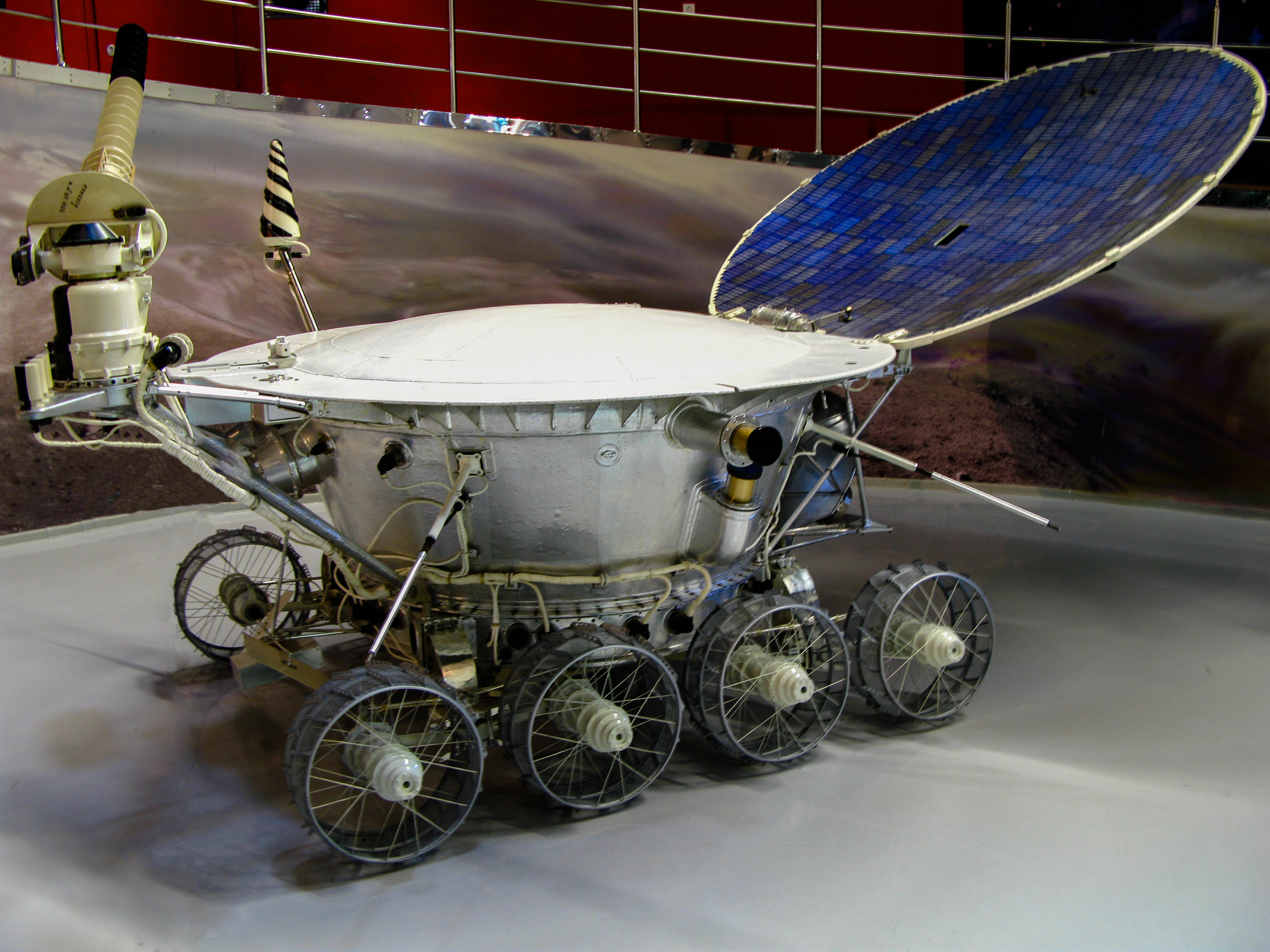
Lunokhod-1 model, Memorial Museum of Cosmonautics

After the unsuccessful launch of its first rover mission in 1969, the Soviet Union sent the Lunokhod 1 robotic rover to the lunar surface in November 1970. It remained operational until October 1971. The rover was deployed in Mare Imbrium by the Luna 17 lander. Lunokhod 1 was the first rover to land on another celestial body.

=== Apollo Lunar Roving Vehicle ===
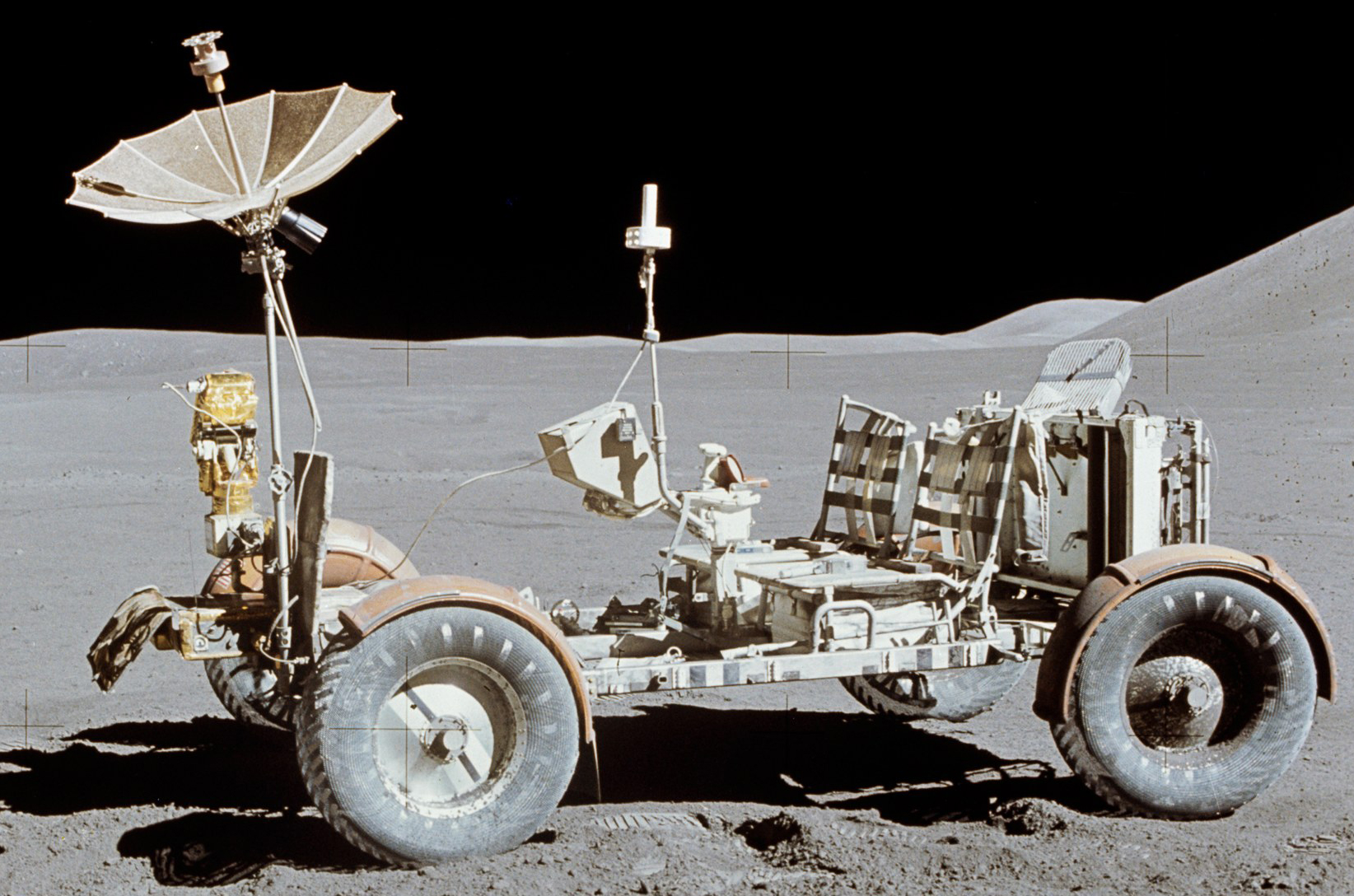
The Apollo 15 Lunar Roving Vehicle on the Moon in 1971

The Lunar Roving Vehicle (LRV) was a battery-powered four-wheeled vehicle design. The LRV could carry one or two astronauts, their equipment, and lunar samples. During 1971 and 1972, LRVs were used on the Moon for each of the final three missions of the American Apollo program, Apollo 15, 16, and 17.

=== Lunokhod 2 ===
Lunokhod 2 was the second of two monocrystalline-panel-powered uncrewed lunar rovers landed on the Moon by the Soviet Union as part of the Lunokhod program. The Luna 21 spacecraft landed on the Moon and deployed the second Soviet lunar rover Lunokhod 2 in January 1973. The objectives of the mission were to collect images of the lunar surface, examine ambient light levels to determine the feasibility of astronomical observations from the Moon, perform laser ranging experiments, observe solar X-rays, measure local magnetic fields, and study the soil mechanics of the lunar surface material. Lunokhod 2 was intended to be followed by Lunokhod 3 (No.205) in 1977 but the mission was cancelled.

=== Yutu ===
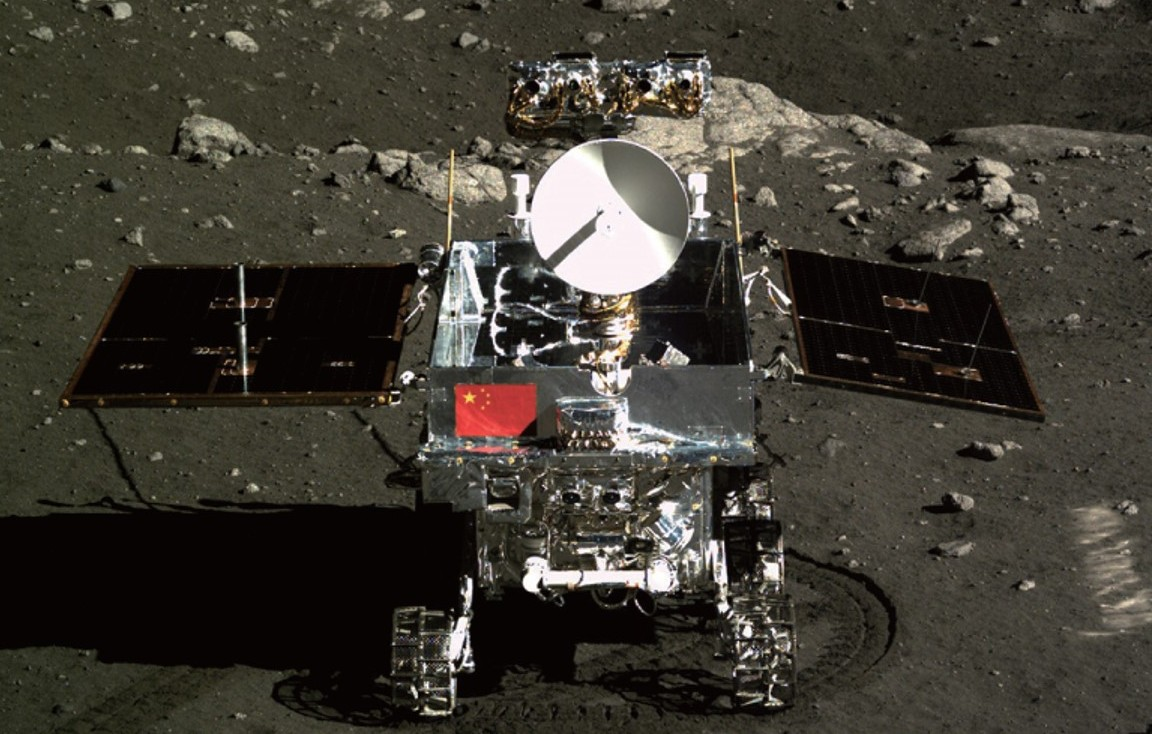
Yutu rover on lunar surface in 2013

Yutu is a Chinese lunar rover that launched on 1 December 2013 and landed on 14 December 2013 as part of the Chang'e 3 mission. It is China's first lunar rover, part of the second phase of the Chinese Lunar Exploration Program undertaken by China National Space Administration (CNSA). The lunar rover is called Yutu, or Jade Rabbit, a name selected in an online poll.

The rover encountered operational difficulties after the first 14-day lunar night, and was unable to move after the end of the second lunar night, finally on August 3, 2016, it officially stopped sending data and doing its operations.

=== Pragyan ===
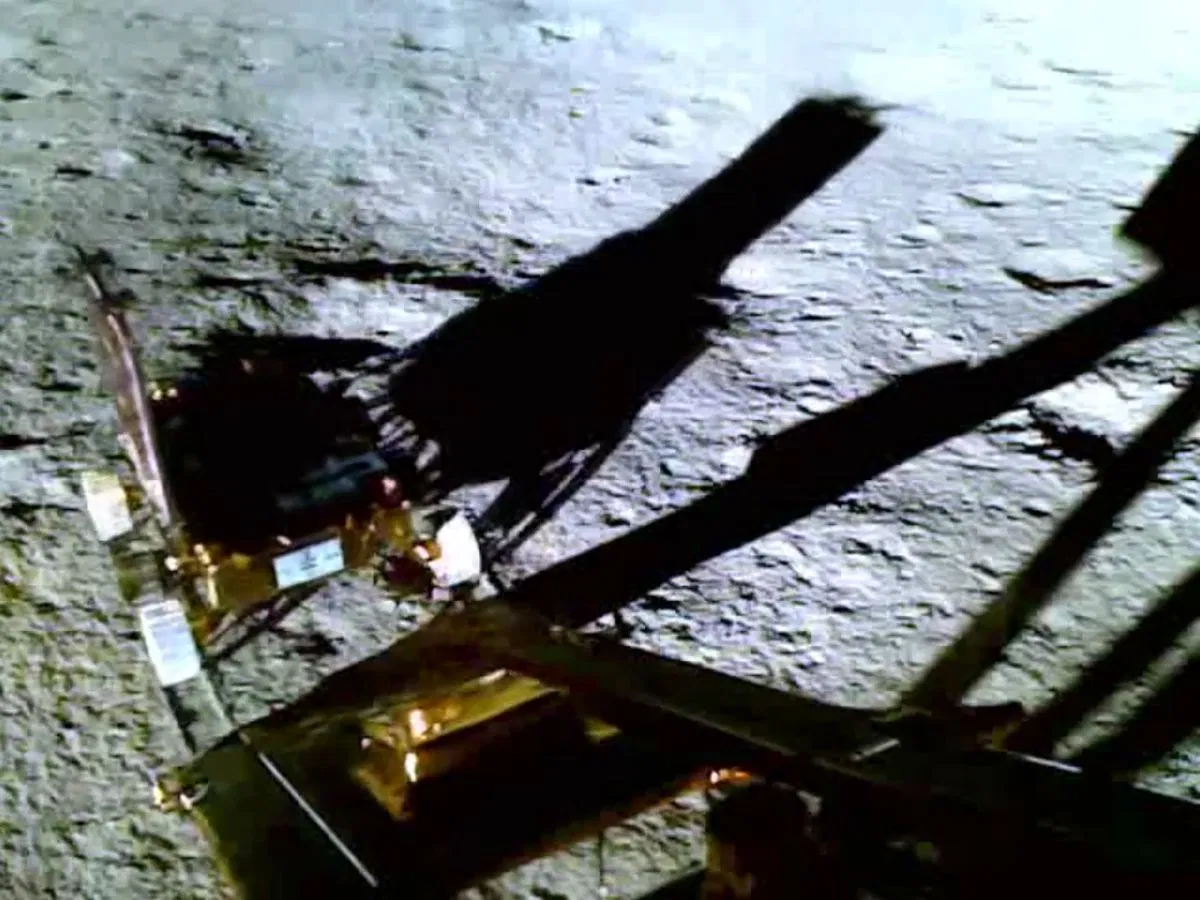
Pragyan on the Moon

Chandrayaan-3 was launched on 14 July 2023 by the Indian Space Research Organisation in India's second attempt to soft land a rover and a lander on the Moon. Pragyan became the first rover to operate near the Moon's south pole when it successfully landed on 23 August 2023, after the lander separation from propulsion module had taken place on 17 August. The Pragyan rover was deployed the same day as landing and has travelled 0.1 km (0.062 mi) since then. On September 2, the rover finished all assignments and entered into a sleep mode in preparation for wake up on September 22, but was unable to do so.

=== SLIM's LEV Rovers ===
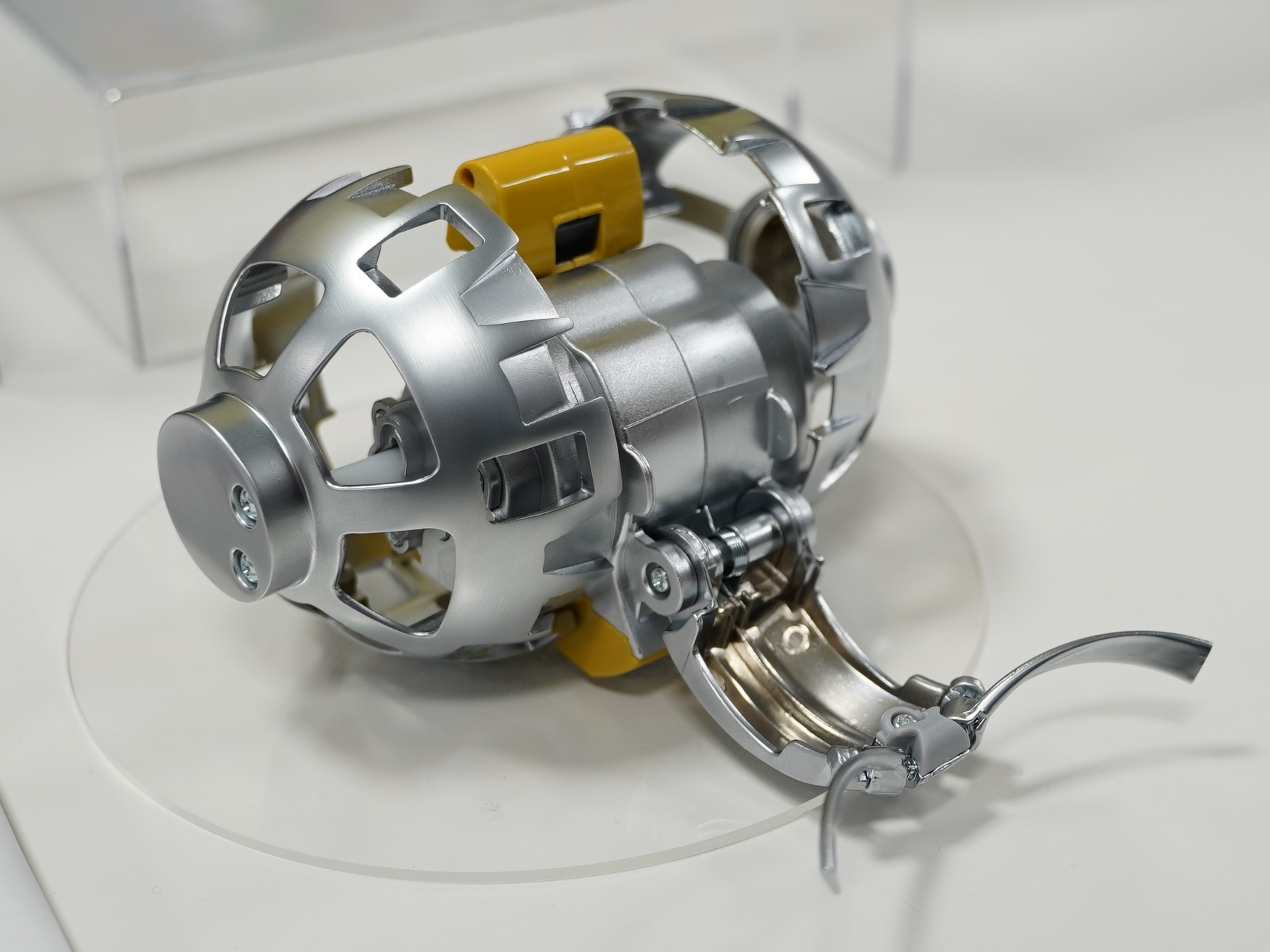
Sora-Q back view

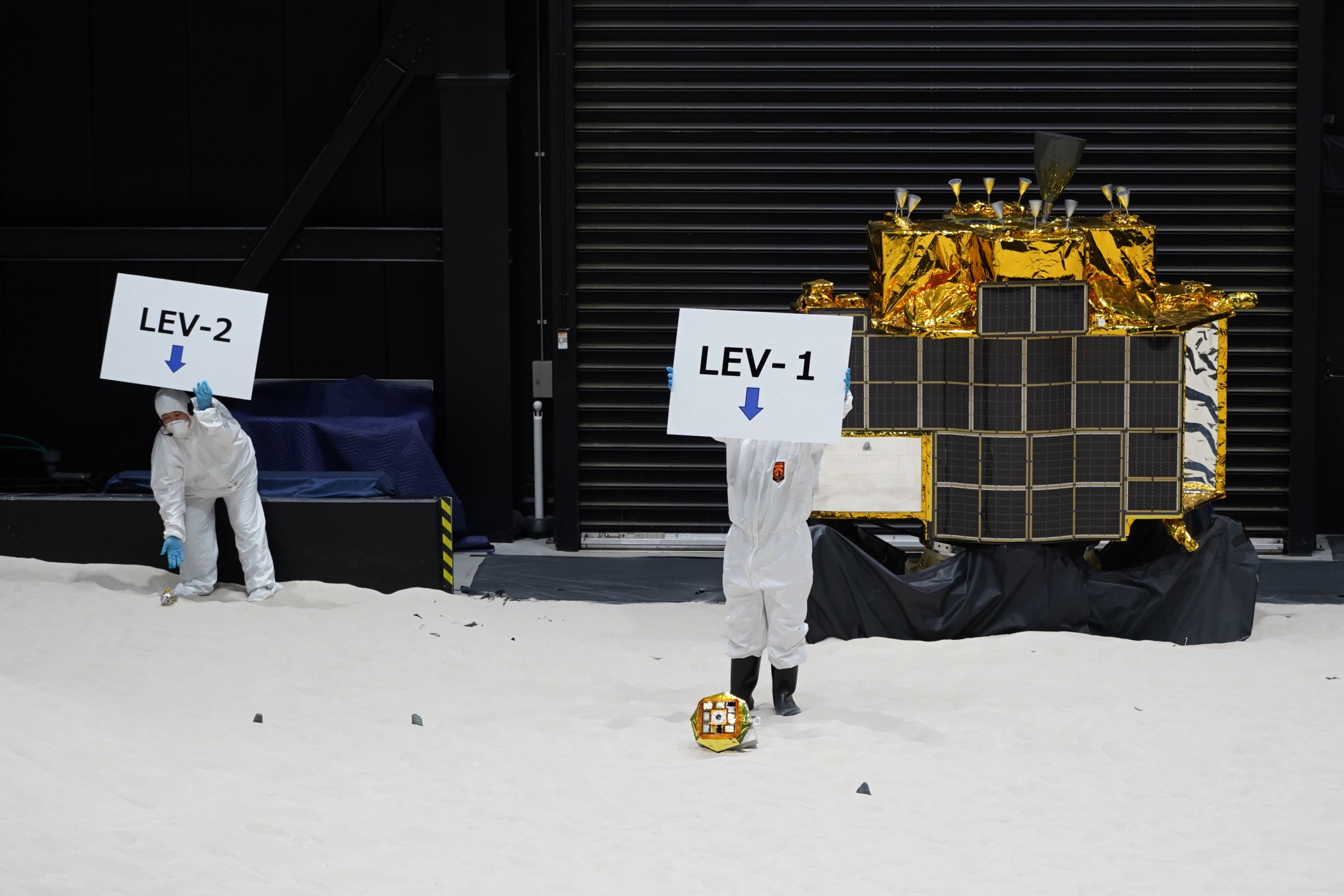
The SLIM lander with LEV-1 and LEV-2 (Sora-Q) rovers

The SLIM lander has two rovers on board, Lunar Excursion Vehicle 1 (LEV-1) (hopper) and Lunar Excursion Vehicle 2 (LEV-2), also known as Sora-Q, a tiny rover developed by JAXA in joint cooperation with Tomy, Sony Group, and Doshisha University. The first rover has direct-to-Earth communication. The second rover is designed to change its shape to traverse around the landing site over a short lifespan of two hours. SLIM was launched on September 6, 2023, and reached lunar orbit on 25 December 2023. The two rovers were successfully deployed and landed separately from SLIM shortly before its own landing on 19 January 2024. LEV-1 conducted seven hops over 107 minutes on lunar surface and LEV-2 imaged SLIM on lunar surface.

=== Jinchan ===
Chinese Chang'e 6 sample return mission carries a mini rover called Jinchan to conduct infrared spectroscopy of lunar surface and imaged Chang'e 6 lander on lunar surface.

== Failed missions ==
=== Pragyan (Chandrayaan-2 rover) ===
Chandrayaan-2 was the second lunar mission by India, consisting of a lunar orbiter, a lander named Vikram, and a rover named Pragyan. The rover weighing 27 kg, had six wheels and was to be operated on solar power. Launched on 22 July 2019, the mission entered lunar orbit on August 20. Pragyan was destroyed along with its lander, Vikram, when it crash-landed on the Moon on 6 September 2019 and never got the chance to deploy.

=== Rashid ===
Rashid was a lunar rover built by the Mohammed bin Rashid Space Centre (MBRSC) to be launched onboard Ispace's lander the Hakuto-R. The rover was launched in November 2022 on Hakuto-R Mission 1, but was destroyed when the lander crashed in April 2023. Rashid was equipped with two high-resolution cameras, a microscopic camera to capture small details, and a thermal imaging camera. The rover carried a Langmuir probe, designed to study the Moon's plasma and will attempt to explain why Moon dust is so sticky. The rover was supposed to study the lunar surface, mobility on the Moon's surface and how different surfaces interact with lunar particles.

=== SORA-Q ===
Sora-Q was developed by Takara Tomy, JAXA and Doshisha University to be launched onboard Ispace's lander called Hakuto-R Mission 1. It was launched in 2022, but was destroyed as the lander crash landed in April 2023. A second rover was successfully deployed from the SLIM lander in January 2024.

=== Peregrine Mission One ===
Peregrine lander launched on 8 January 2024 to the Moon. It took with it 5 Colmena rovers and an Iris rover. The mission of the Peregrine lander was forced to be cancelled after an excessive propellant leak.

=== IM-2 Athena Rovers ===
The IM-2 Athena lander carried a number of rovers to the lunar surface. Micro-Nova Gracie was to explore multiple difficult-to-reach areas such as deep craters on the lunar surface, by firing hydrazine rockets in controlled bursts to propel itself short distances. It was to hop across craters in search of lunar ice, which could contain water critical to future crewed missions to the Moon. MAPP LV1 was to collect lunar samples for NASA under a contract worth just $1, which is symbolic of a new incentive for the emerging commercial space industry to access resources in space. It was to also autonomously map the lunar surface, capture stereo images and thermal data, and inspect samples of lunar regolith in a special bin mounted on its wheels. MAPP LV1 was to deploy the AstroAnt miniature rover, the size of a matchbox, to conduct contactless temperature measurements as it drove around on MAPP's roof. Japan's Yaoki rover aimed to test mobility technologies. IM-2 landed on 6 March 2025. The spacecraft was intact after touchdown but resting on its side, thereby complicating its planned science and technology demonstration mission; this outcome is similar to what occurred with the company's IM-1 Odysseus spacecraft in 2024.

=== TENACIOUS ===
The Hakuto-R Mission 2 lander was intended to deliver a 5 kg (11 lb) rover called "TENACIOUS", which would explore the area around the landing site after being lowered from the lander. The mission was scheduled to land in the center of Mare Frigoris on 5 June 2026, 19:17 UTC, with 3 nearby backup landing spots and times.

90 seconds before the projected landing, communication was lost and the lander crashed.

== Active missions ==
=== Yutu-2 ===
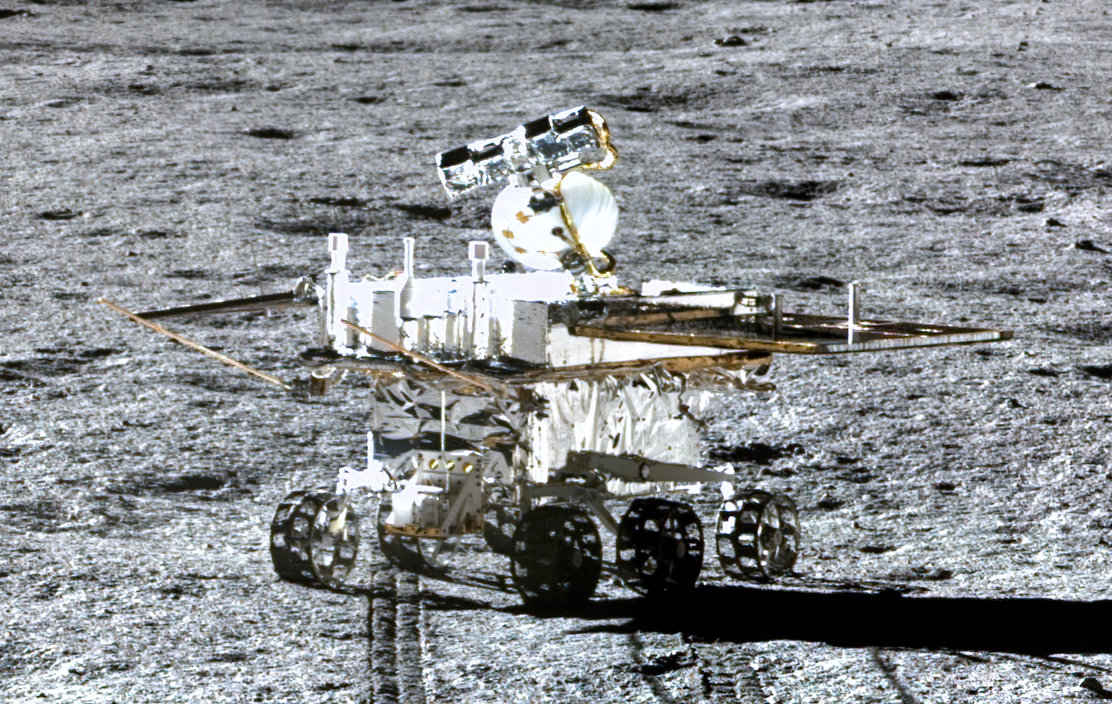
Yutu-2 on the Moon

The Chang'e 4 Chinese mission launched on 7 December 2018, and landed and deployed the Yutu-2 rover on the far side of the Moon on 3 January 2019. It is the first rover to operate on the Moon's far side.

In December 2019, Yutu 2 broke the lunar longevity record, previously held by the Soviet Union's Lunokhod 1 rover, which operated on the lunar surface for eleven lunar days (321 Earth days) and traversed a total distance of 10.54 km (6.55 mi).

In February 2020, Chinese astronomers reported, for the first time, a high-resolution image of a lunar ejecta sequence, and, as well, direct analysis of its internal architecture. These were based on observations made by the Lunar Penetrating Radar (LPR) on board the Yutu-2 rover while studying the far side of the Moon.

Data from its two-channel ground penetrating radar (GPR) has been used by scientists to put together an image of multiple layers beneath the surface of the far side of the Moon up to a depth of 300 meters.

Yutu-2 is currently operational and is the longest-lived lunar rover to date.

== Planned missions ==
=== Roo-ver ===
Roo-ver is the first Australia funded rover. Weighing 20 kilograms and being the size of a carry-suitcase. Roo-ver will land by 2030 at the least.

== Proposed missions ==
=== ATHLETE ===
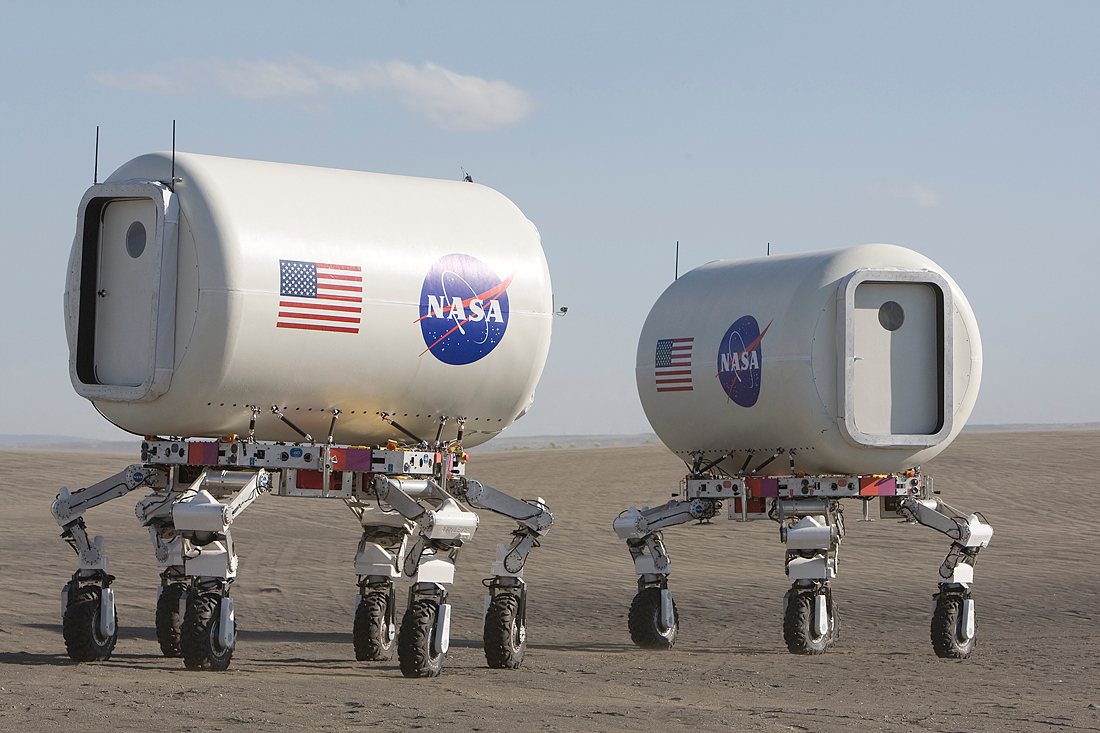
ATHLETE rover concepts with crew habitats models, 2008.

NASA's plans for future Moon missions call for rovers that have a far longer range than the Apollo rovers. The All-Terrain Hex-Legged Extra-Terrestrial Explorer (ATHLETE) is a six-legged robotic lunar rover test-bed under development by the Jet Propulsion Laboratory (JPL). ATHLETE is a testbed for systems and is designed for use on the Moon. The system is in development along with NASA's Johnson and Ames Centers, Stanford University and Boeing. ATHLETE is designed, for maximum efficiency, to be able to both roll and walk over a wide range of terrains.

=== Lunar Polar Exploration Mission rover ===
The Lunar Polar Exploration Mission is a robotic lunar mission concept by Indian Space Research Organisation and the Japan Aerospace Exploration Agency that would send a lunar rover and lander to explore the south pole region of the Moon in 2028. The Japanese agency is likely to provide the under-development H3 launch vehicle and the rover, while the Indian agency would be responsible for the lander.

=== PROMISE ===
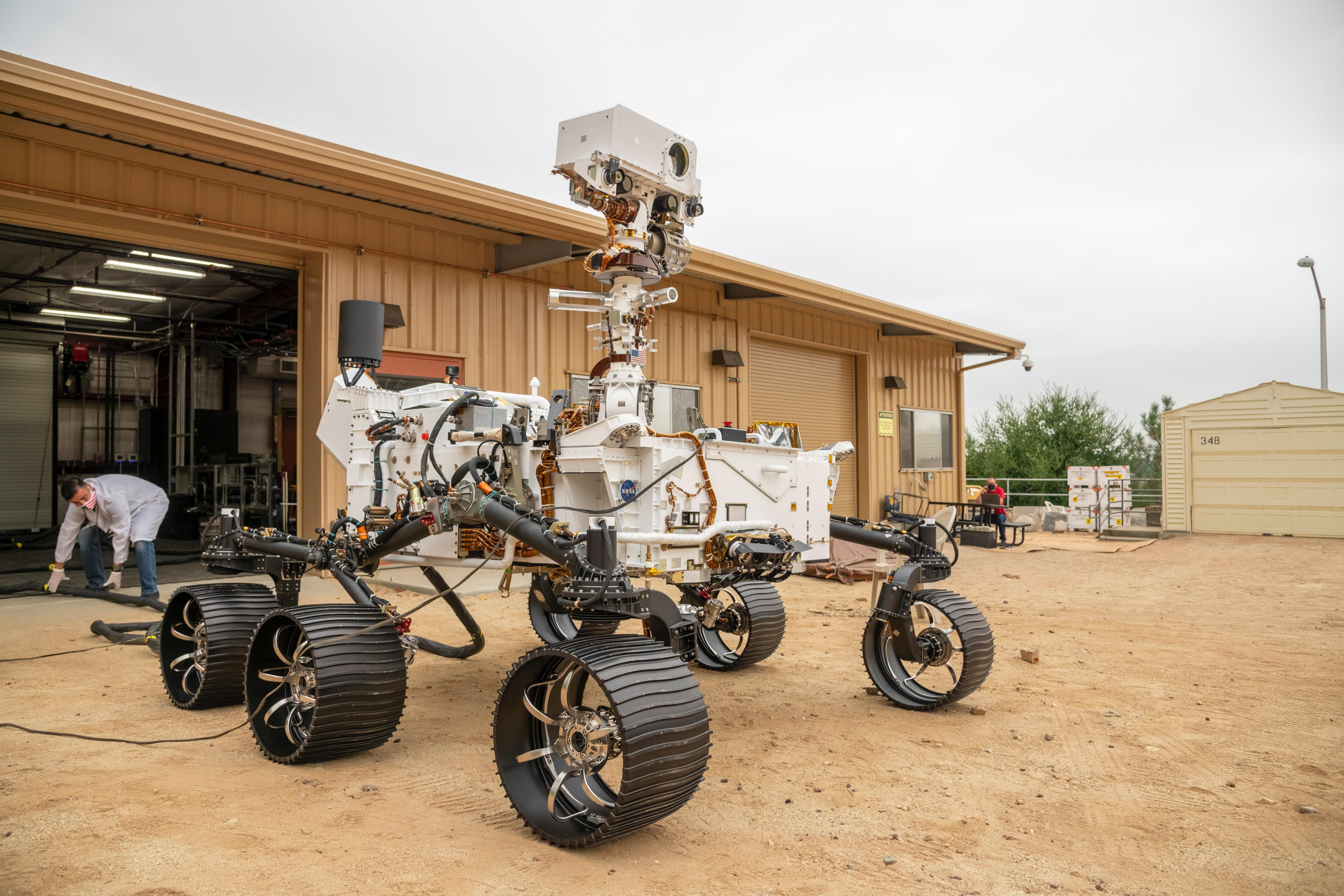
The OPTIMISM test article in September 2020.

In June 2026, NASA announced they were considering proposals to convert OPTIMISM, the vehicle system test bed (VSTB) for the Perseverance rover into a lunar rover named PROMISE, or Polar Rover for Observation, Mapping, and In-Situ Exploration.

== Cancelled ==
=== Lunokhod 3 ===
Lunokhod 3 was built for a Moon landing in 1977 as Luna 25 but never flew to the Moon due to lack of launchers and funding. It remains at the NPO Lavochkin museum.

=== Apollo Lunar Roving Vehicle 4, 5 and 6 ===
They would have been for Apollo 18, 19 and 20. Only the rover for Apollo 18 (LRV-4) was built. After the cancellation of that mission, it was used as spare parts for the previous rovers.

=== Resource Prospector ===
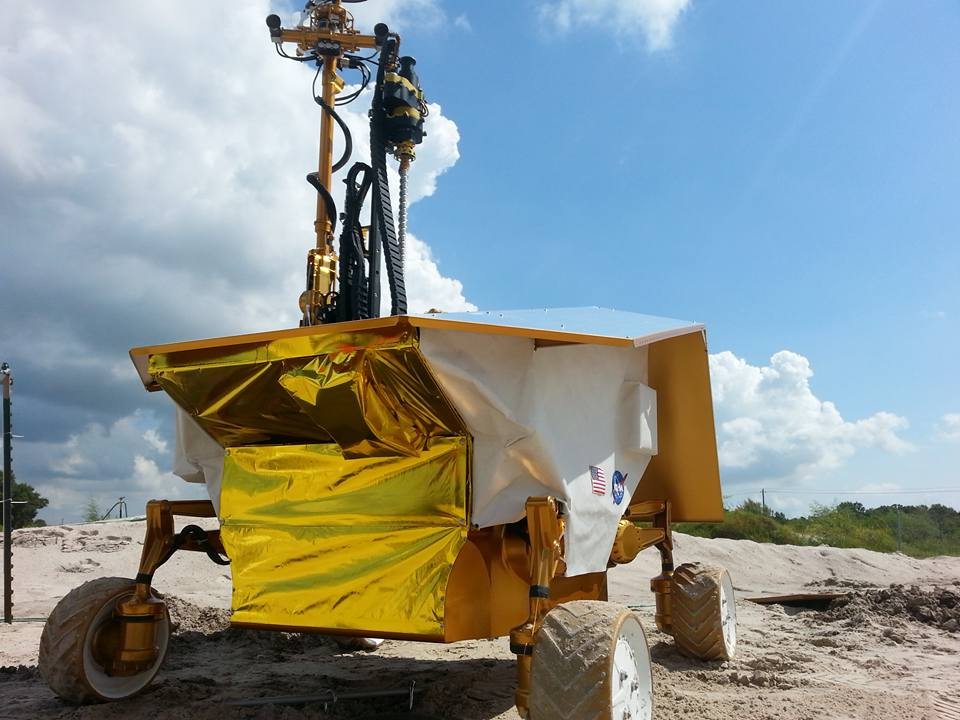
Engineering prototype of the Resource Prospector lunar rover undergoing tests.

Resource Prospector is a cancelled mission concept by NASA of a rover that would have performed a survey expedition on a polar region of the Moon. The rover was to attempt to detect and map the location of volatiles such as hydrogen, oxygen and lunar water which could foster more affordable and sustainable human exploration to the Moon, Mars, and other Solar System bodies. The mission concept was still in its pre-formulation stage when it was scrapped in April 2018. The Resource Prospector mission was proposed to be launched in 2022. Its science instruments will be flown on several commercial lander missions contracted with NASA's new Commercial Lunar Payload Services program.

=== VIPER ===
VIPER (Volatiles Investigating Polar Exploration Rover) is a lunar rover being developed at the NASA Ames Research Center. The rover's main mission is to prospect for lunar resources in permanently shadowed areas of the lunar south pole region, especially by mapping the distribution and concentration of water ice. The mission is built on a previous NASA rover concept, the Resource Prospector, which had been cancelled in 2018. VIPER was to be carried aboard Astrobotic's Griffin lander as part of NASA's Commercial Lunar Payload Services (CLPS) initiative. However, NASA terminated the VIPER project in July 2024 due to cost increases and launch delays. NASA subsequently revived the project in September 2025, releasing an Announcement for Partnership Proposal seeking U.S. companies to deliver and operate the completed VIPER rover on the Moon. In September 2025, NASA selected Blue Origin to carry VIPER to the Moon. Under this partnership, Blue Origin will design, test, and operate a lander to carry the rover to the Moon.

== See also ==
- CubeRover, a class of modular lunar rovers
- Exploration of the Moon
- Tank on the Moon, 2007 documentary film
- List of rovers on extraterrestrial bodies
- Mars rovers
- Space rover
