= Prospector (spacecraft) =

Proposed NASA lunar probe

Prospector was a proposed lunar probe that was intended to be flown in support of the Apollo lunar missions.

== History ==
Prospector arose as a result of President John F. Kennedy's desire to rehabilitate the tarnished image of US spaceflight. In 1961, NASA proposed a series of robotic probes, including Prospector, to be managed by the Jet Propulsion Laboratory.

Prospector was based on a study that had been performed by the Marshall Space Flight Center in June 1960, to determine what lunar missions could be achieved using the Saturn I rocket.

NASA envisioned Prospector as "a large versatile 'space truck'" that could be launched by a Saturn rocket and that could soft-land on the Moon with a wide variety of payloads. Among the applications envisioned were:

- A remote-controlled lunar rover that could explore large areas of the lunar surface, including the far side of the Moon
- A system to obtain lunar samples and return them to Earth
- A low-altitude survey of the lunar surface for reconnaissance, and to help select landing sites for subsequent Apollo missions, using large propellant tanks to allow the spacecraft to hover and laterally move over the lunar surface
- An uncrewed cargo spacecraft, providing supplies and materials to lunar astronauts

Prospector was initially planned to have its first launch between 1963 and 1966. However, as plans progressed, the project ran into weight overruns, requiring a larger launcher such as the Saturn V. Its role also began to change from one of support for the Apollo missions to more of a substitute for them, which NASA's Space Task Group did not endorse. The project was canceled in 1962.

== See also ==
- Lunar resources
- Luna-Glob, a current Russian lander program
- Lunar Prospector
- Resource Prospector (rover)
- Robotic exploration of the Moon
