= Resource Prospector =

Cancelled NASA mission concept

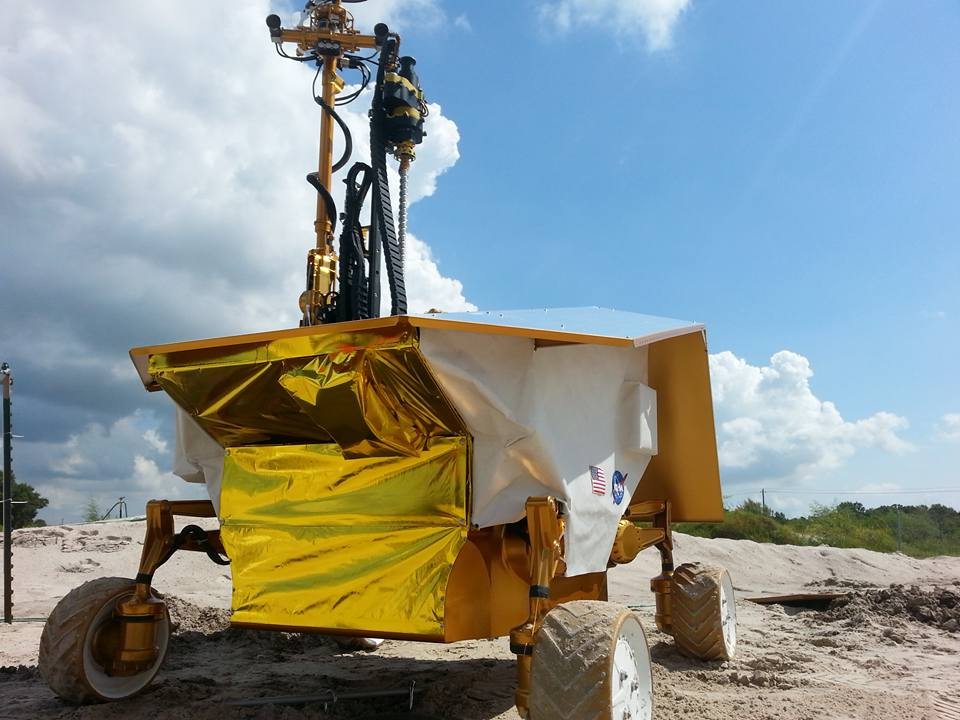
- Engineering prototype of the Resource Prospector lunar rover undergoing tests
- Mission type: Reconnaissance, ISRU technology
- Operator: NASA
- Website: www.nasa.gov/resource-prospector
- Mission duration: 6 - 14 days (proposed)

Spacecraft properties
- Spacecraft type: Lunar rover
- Launch mass: 5,000 kg (11,000 lb)
- Landing mass: 300 kg (660 lb)
- Dimensions: 1.4 m × 1.4 m × 2 m
- Power: 300 watts (solar array)

Start of mission
- Launch date: 2022
- Rocket: Falcon 9 Block 5 (suggested)
- Launch site: Cape Canaveral
- Contractor: SpaceX (suggested)

Moon rover
- Landing site: Lunar polar region

Resource Prospector is a cancelled mission concept by NASA of a rover that would have performed a survey expedition on a polar region of the Moon. The rover was to attempt to detect and map the location of volatiles such as hydrogen, oxygen and lunar water which could foster more affordable and sustainable human exploration to the Moon, Mars, and other Solar System bodies.

The mission concept was still in its pre-formulation stage, when it was scrapped in April 2018. The Resource Prospector mission was proposed to be launched in 2022. Its science instruments will be flown on several commercial lander missions contracted with NASA's new Commercial Lunar Payload Services program. The VIPER rover was developed as a successor of Resource Prospector.

== Overview ==
In February 1976, the Soviet lander Luna 24 sent a sample of lunar soil to Earth, where it was found to contain about 0.1% water. Data obtained by the Lunar Reconnaissance Orbiter (LRO), Chandrayaan-1, and the Lunar Crater Observation and Sensing Satellite (LCROSS), revealed that lunar water is distributed widely (if thinly) across the Moon's surface.

The Resource Prospector mission concept proposed a NASA-led collaboration that would seek international space agencies and private industry partners to maximize the value. Hydrogen and oxygen can be used to make vital consumables, but also, to make rocket fuel, and basic materials required for in-space manufacturing. The technical process is called in situ resource utilization or ISRU. The rover would have used a drill to extract samples of the lunar soil from as deep as one meter below the surface. The Taiwanese National Chung-Shan Institute of Science and Technology was responsible for developing the rover's sensor system.

In 2012 the RESOLVE instrument which was tested in the field. RESOLVE was described as "the heart" of the Resource Prospector mission. In September 2015, the rover prototype underwent field testing, and in May 2016, the prototype rover underwent thermal vacuum and thermal testing at NASA's Johnson Space Center in Houston, Texas. Before its cancellation, NASA officials were exploring various launch options, including to fly it as a secondary payload on board the second flight of the Space Launch System, called the Artemis II in 2022. Another reported launch option was the Falcon Heavy rocket.

=== Cancellation ===
The Resource Prospector team was notified on 23 April 2018 to cease all work on the project by the end of May 2018. The concept was going to be submitted for a major design review by the end of 2018 for funding, development and launch. This rover was the only mission in conceptual development by NASA to explore the surface of the Moon in situ. Apparently, the cancellation stemmed from the program being moved to another Division with an insufficient budget to fund this mission. US$100 million were already spent on the rover's instruments over ten years. Scientists involved in the Lunar Exploration Analysis Group sent a letter on 26 April 2018 to the NASA administrator, James Bridenstine laying their case to reverse the decision, and remarked that other nations are preparing landers to stake claim on the natural resources on the south polar region of the Moon.

In a 3 May 2018 statement, NASA officials explained that lunar surface exploration will continue in the future, but using commercial lander services under a new Commercial Lunar Payload Services (CLPS) program. Some of these commercial landers will be equipped with the ice drill and scientific instruments developed for the Resource Prospector. NASA officials stated that under this program, Resource Prospector instruments will go forward in an expanded lunar surface campaign, instead of the original two weeks.

== Mission ==
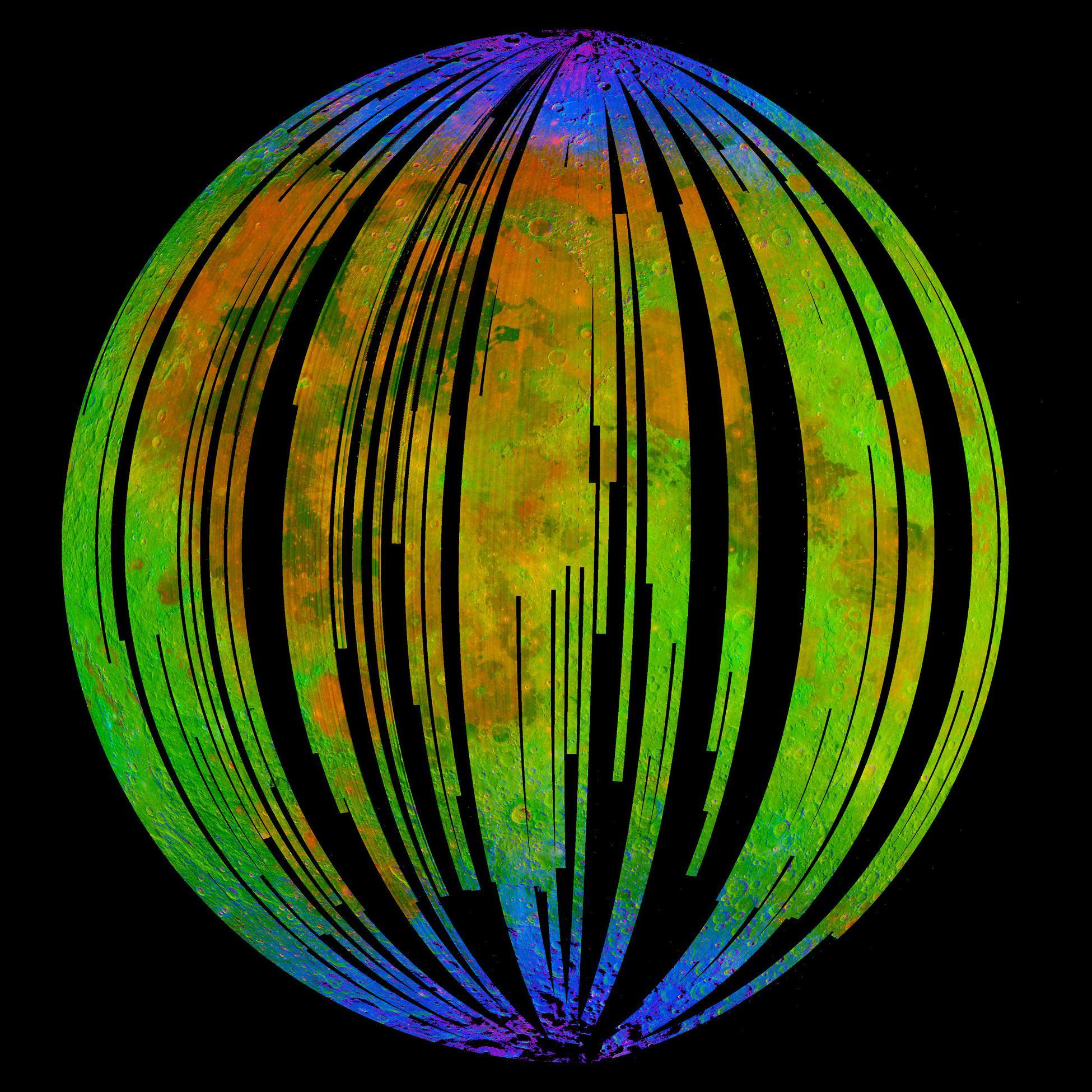
Orbital survey of the Moon taken by the Moon Mineralogy Mapper instrument on India's Chandrayaan-1 spacecraft. Blue shows the spectral signature of hydroxide, green shows the brightness of the surface as measured by reflected infrared radiation from the Sun and red shows a mineral called pyroxene.

Preliminary studies call for a rover of about 300 kg (660 lb), that would measure 1.4 m x 1.4 m x 2 m. It was suggested to be launched with a Falcon 9 rocket. The mission life would have been between 6 and 14 Earth days.

=== Goal ===
The motivation and purpose of the mission was to characterize the nature and distribution of lunar water and other volatiles in lunar polar sub-surface materials, and to demonstrate in situ resource utilization (ISRU) processing of lunar soil by heating samples in an oven and isolating the resulting volatiles.

== Conceptual payload ==
The conceptual payload includes:

- Neutron Spectrometer System (NSS)
- Near InfraRed Volatiles Spectrometer System (NIRVSS)
- One meter long core drill
- Oven

== See also ==
- Luna-Glob, a current Russian lander program
- Lunar Prospector, a lunar orbiter launched in 1998
- Prospector (spacecraft), a lander mission concept cancelled in 1962
- Lunar resources
- VIPER, a cancelled successor of Resource Prospector, though potentially revived in September, 2025
