= Lunar Prospector =

Third mission of the Discovery program; polar orbital reconnaissance of the Moon

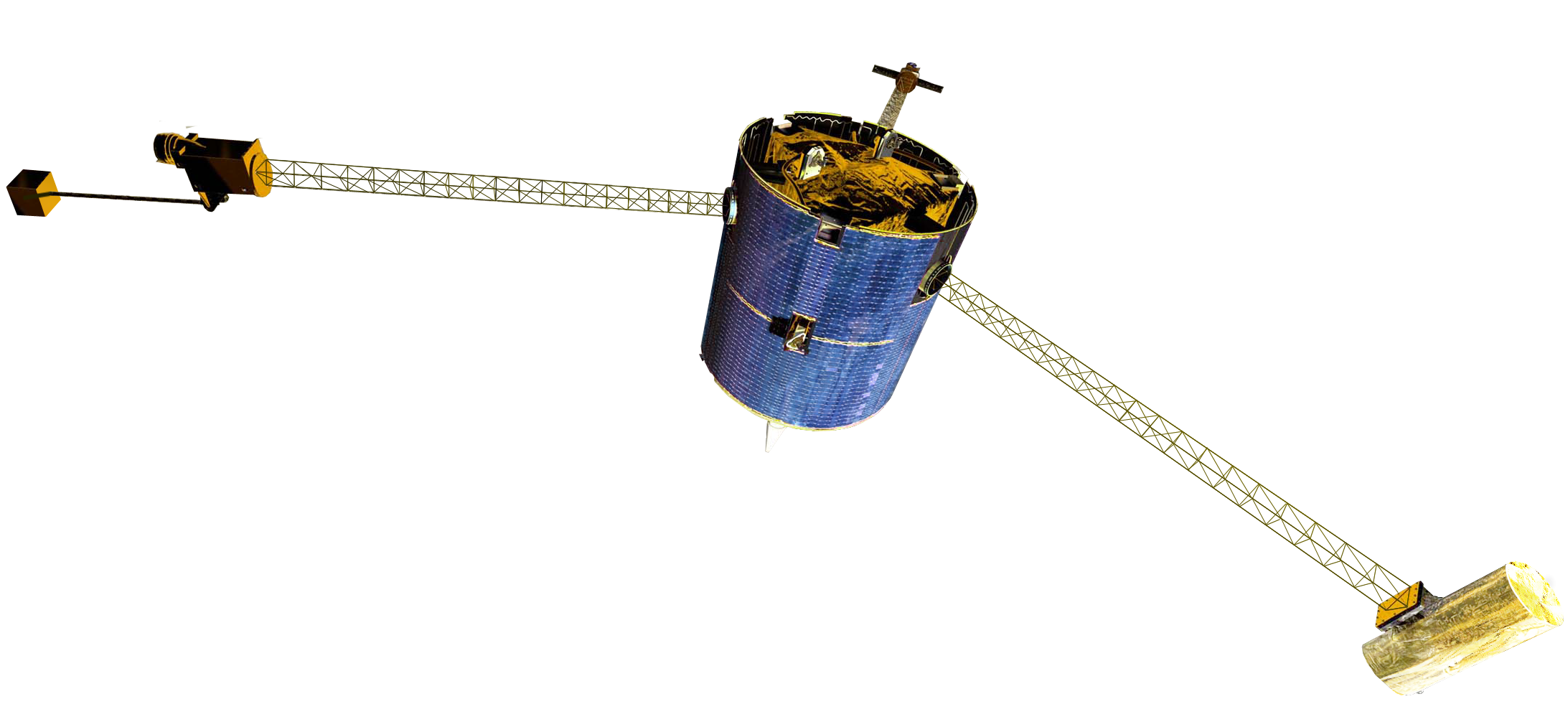
- Lunar Prospector
- Mission type: Lunar orbiter
- Operator: NASA
- COSPAR ID: 1998-001A
- SATCAT no.: 25131
- Mission duration: 570 days

Spacecraft properties
- Bus: LM-100
- Manufacturer: Lockheed Martin
- Launch mass: 296.4 kilograms (653 lb)
- Dry mass: 126 kilograms (278 lb)
- Power: 202.0 W

Start of mission
- Launch date: January 7, 1998, 02:28:44 UTC
- Rocket: Athena II
- Launch site: Cape Canaveral SLC-46
- Contractor: Lockheed Martin Space Systems

End of mission
- Disposal: Deorbited (Moon impact)
- Decay date: July 31, 1999, 09:52:02 UTC

Orbital parameters
- Reference system: Selenocentric
- Eccentricity: 0.00046
- Periselene altitude: 99.45 kilometers (61.80 mi)
- Aposelene altitude: 101.2 kilometers (62.9 mi)
- Inclination: 90.55 degrees
- Period: 117.9 minutes
- Epoch: January 16, 1998

Lunar orbiter
- Orbital insertion: January 11, 1998, 10:28 UTC
- Impact site: 87.7°S 42.1°E
- Orbits: ~7060

Instruments
- Gamma ray spectrometer (GRS); Lunar Prospector neutron spectrometer (NS); Alpha particle spectrometer (APS); Doppler gravity experiment (DGE); Magnetometer (MAG); Electron reflectometer (ER)
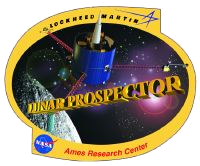
- Official insignia of the Lunar Prospector mission Discovery Program

Lunar Prospector was a spacecraft that orbited the Moon for 19 months in 1998-99. From a low polar orbit, it mapped surface composition including lunar hydrogen deposits, measured magnetic and gravity fields, and studied lunar outgassing events. The mission ended July 31, 1999, when the orbiter was deliberately crashed into a crater near the lunar south pole.

Data from the mission provided detailed mapping of the surface composition of the Moon, and helped to improve understanding of the origin, evolution, current state, and resources of the Moon. The mission identified the presence of hydrogen, implying deposits of ice on the Moon. Several articles on the scientific results were published in the journal Science.

Lunar Prospector was the third mission selected by NASA for full development and construction as part of the Discovery Program. It was managed by NASA Ames Research Center with the prime contractor being Lockheed Martin; it cost $62.8 million. The Principal Investigator for the mission was Alan Binder. His personal account of the mission, Lunar Prospector: Against all Odds, is highly critical of the bureaucracy of NASA overall, and of its contractors.

== Spacecraft and subsystems ==
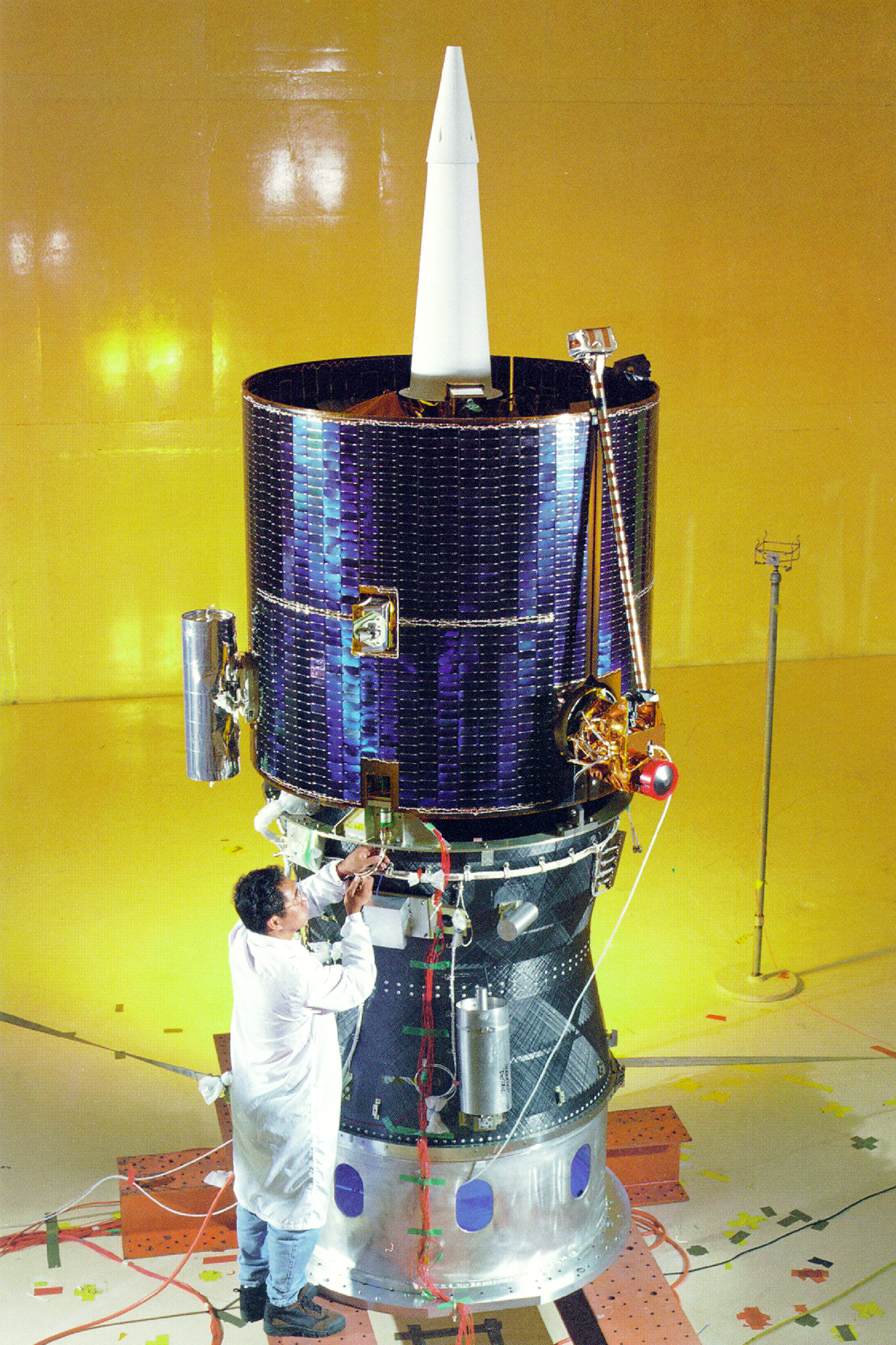
The fully assembled Lunar Prospector spacecraft is shown mated atop the Star 37 Trans Lunar Injection module

The spacecraft was a graphite-epoxy drum, 1.36 m (4 ft 6 in) in diameter and 1.28 m (4 ft 2 in) high with three radial 2.5 m (8 ft 2 in) instrument booms. A 1.1 m (3 ft 7 in) extension boom at the end of one of the 2.5 m booms held the magnetometer. Total initial mass (fully fueled) was 296 kg (653 lb). It was spin-stabilized (nominal spin rate 12 rpm) with its spin axis normal to the ecliptic plane. The spacecraft was controlled by six hydrazine monopropellant 22-newton thrusters (two aft, two forward, and two tangential). Three fuel tanks mounted inside the drum held 138 kg (304 lb) of hydrazine pressurized by helium. The power system consisted of body-mounted solar cells which produced an average of 186 W and a 4.8 A·h rechargeable NiCd battery.

Communications were through two S band transponders, a slotted, phased-array medium-gain antenna for downlink, and an omnidirectional low-gain antenna for downlink and uplink. The on-board computer was a Harris 80C86 (based on Intel's 8086) with 64 kilobytes of EEPROM and 64 kilobytes of static RAM. All control was from the ground, the computer echoing each command to the ground for verification there. Once the command was ground-verified, an "execute" command from the ground told the computer to proceed with execution of the command. The computer built telemetry data as a combination of immediate data and also read from a circular queue buffer which allowed the computer to repeat data it had read 53 minutes earlier. This simple solid-state recorder ensured that all data collected during communications blackout periods would be received, providing the blackout was not longer than 53 minutes.

The probe also carried a small amount of the remains of Eugene Shoemaker (April 28, 1928 – July 18, 1997), astrogeologist and co-discoverer of Comet Shoemaker-Levy 9, to the Moon for a space burial.

In 2013 an unidentified piece of space junk was discovered in an unstable orbit around the Earth, and assigned the provisional number WT1190F. After it crashed into the Indian Ocean, the object was identified as probably the translunar injector of Lunar Prospector.

== Mission profile ==
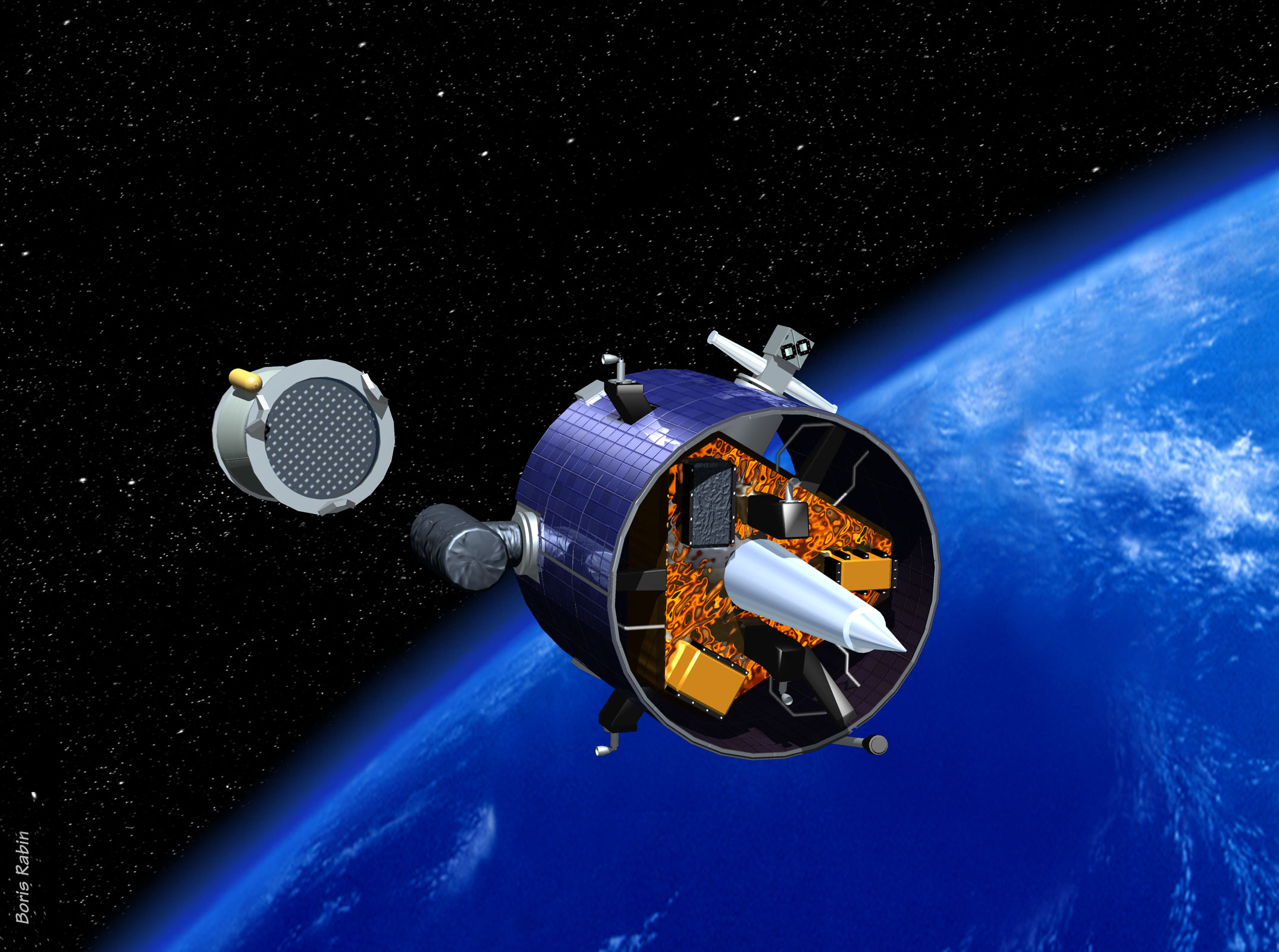
Artist's impression of NASA's Lunar Prospector probe leaving Earth orbit after separating from the booster fourth stage.

Animation of Lunar Prospector's trajectory from January 7, 1998 to January 19, 1998 Lunar Prospector · Moon

Animation of Lunar Prospector's trajectory around Moon from January 11, 1998 to January 20, 1998 Lunar Prospector Moon

Following its launch on January 7, 1998 UT (January 6 EST), aboard a four-stage Athena II rocket, Lunar Prospector had a 105-hour cruise to the Moon. During the cruise, the three instrument booms were deployed. The MAG and APS collected calibration data, while the GRS, NS, and ER outgassed for one day, after which they also collected calibration data in cislunar space. The craft was inserted into an 11.6-hour period capture orbit about the Moon at the end of the cruise phase. After 24 hours Lunar Prospector was inserted into a 3.5-hour period intermediate orbit, followed 24 hours later (on January 13, 1998) by transfer into a 92 km × 153 km (57 mi × 95 mi) preliminary mapping orbit, and then on January 16 by insertion into the near-circular 100 km (62 mi) altitude nominal lunar polar mapping orbit with an inclination of 90 degrees and a period of 118 minutes. Lunar calibration data was collected during the 11.6- and 3.5-hour orbits. Lunar mapping data collection started shortly after the 118 minute orbit was achieved. The data collection was periodically interrupted during the mission as planned for orbital maintenance burns, which took place to recircularize the orbit whenever the periselene or aposelene was more than 20 km (12 mi) to 25 km (16 mi) from the 100 km nominal orbit; this occurred about once per month. On December 19, 1998, a maneuver lowered the orbit to 40 km (25 mi) to perform higher resolution studies. The orbit was altered again on January 28 to a 15 km × 45 km (9.3 mi × 28.0 mi) orbit, ending the one year primary mission and beginning the extended mission.

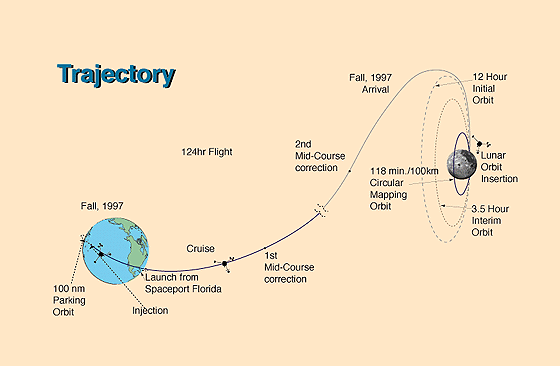
Path of Lunar Prospector space probe

The mission ended on July 31, 1999, at 9:52:02 UT (5:52:02 EDT), when Lunar Prospector was steered into a deliberate collision in a permanently shadowed area of the Shoemaker crater near the lunar south pole. It was hoped that the impact would liberate water vapor from the suspected ice deposits in the crater and that the plume would be detectable from Earth; no plume was observed.

The Lunar Prospector mission was the third mission selected by NASA for full development and launch as part of NASA's Discovery Program. Total cost for the mission was $63 million including development ($34 million), launch vehicle (~$25 million) and operations (~$4 million).

== Instruments ==
The spacecraft carried six instruments: a Gamma Ray Spectrometer, a Neutron spectrometer, a Magnetometer, an Electron Reflectometer, an Alpha Particle Spectrometer, and a Doppler Gravity Experiment. The instruments were omnidirectional and required no sequencing. The normal observation sequence was to record and downlink data continuously.

=== Gamma Ray Spectrometer (GRS) ===
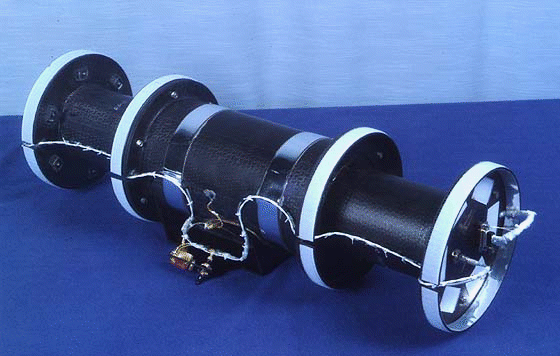
Lunar Prospector Gamma Ray Spectrometer (GRS)

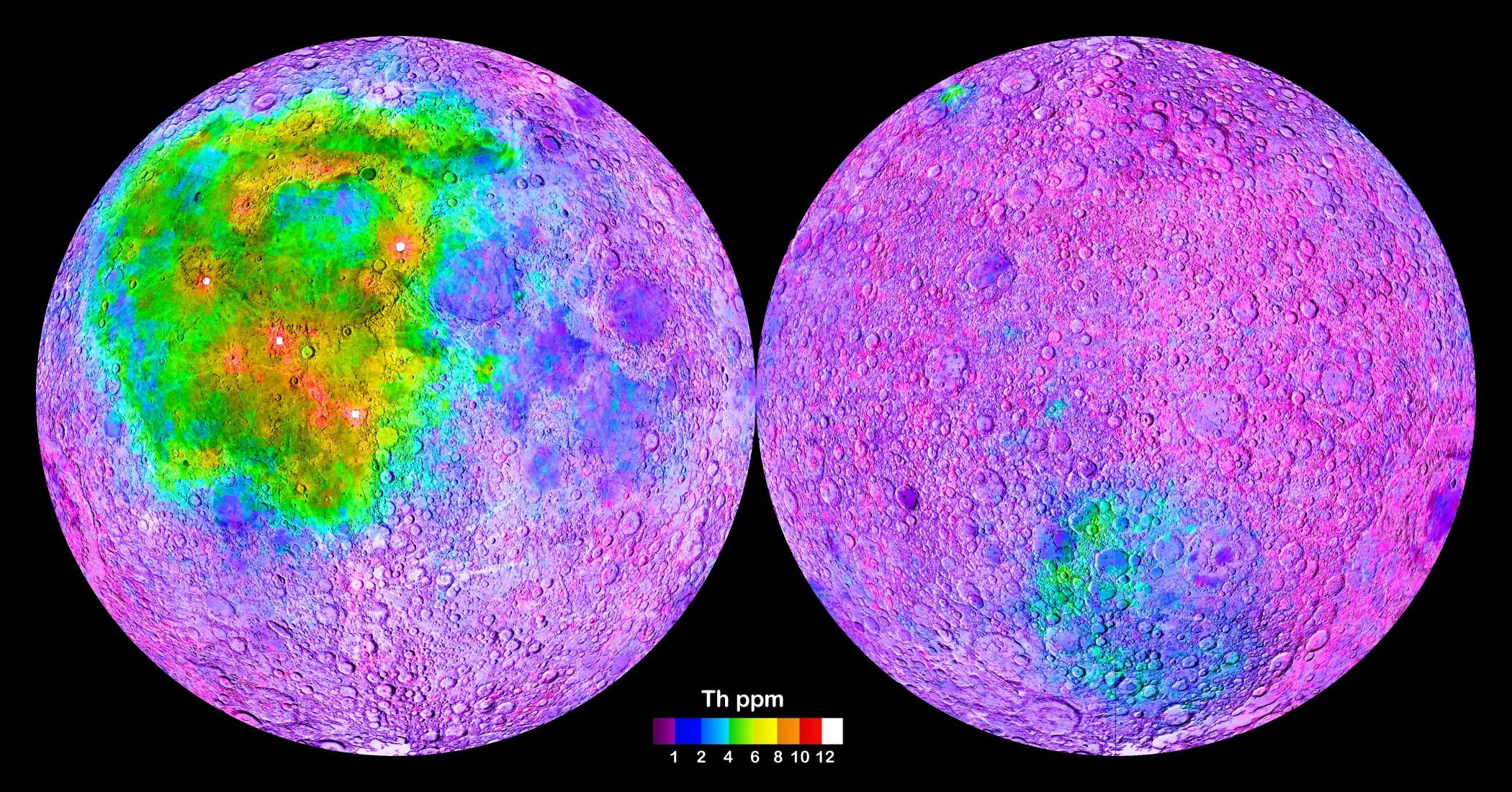
Thorium concentrations on the Moon, as mapped by Lunar Prospector

The Lunar Prospector Gamma Ray Spectrometer (GRS) produced the first global measurements of gamma-ray spectra from the lunar surface, from which are derived the first "direct" measurements of the chemical composition for the entire lunar surface.

The GRS was a small cylinder which was mounted on the end of one of the three 2.5 m (8 ft 2 in) radial booms extending from Lunar Prospector. It consisted of a bismuth germanate crystal surrounded by a shield of borated plastic. Gamma rays striking the bismuth atoms produced a flash of light with an intensity proportional to the energy of the gamma ray which was recorded by detectors. The energy of the gamma ray is associated with the element responsible for its emission. Due to a low signal-to-noise ratio, multiple passes were required to generate statistically significant results. At nine passes per month, it was expected to take about three months to confidently estimate abundances of thorium, potassium, and uranium, and 12 months for the other elements. The precision varies according to element measured. For U, Th, and K, the precision is 7% to 15%, for Fe 45%, for Ti 20%, and for the overall distribution of KREEP 15% to 30%. The borated plastic shield was used in the detection of fast neutrons. The GRS was designed to achieve global coverage from an altitude of approximately 100 km (62 mi) and with a surface resolution of 150 km (93 mi).

The instrument mapped the distribution of various important elements across the Moon. For example, the Lunar Prospector GRS identified several regions with high iron concentrations.

The fundamental purpose of the GRS experiment was to provide global maps of elemental abundances on the lunar surface. The GRS was designed to record the spectrum of gamma rays emitted by:

1. the radioactive decay of elements contained in the Moon's crust; and
2. elements in the crust bombarded by cosmic rays and solar wind particles.

The most important elements detectable by the GRS were uranium (U), thorium (Th), and potassium (K), radioactive elements which generate gamma rays spontaneously, and iron (Fe), titanium (Ti), oxygen (O), silicon (Si), aluminum (Al), magnesium (Mg), and calcium (Ca), elements which emit gamma rays when hit by cosmic rays or solar wind particles. The uranium, thorium, and potassium in particular were used to map the location of KREEP (potassium, rare-earth element, and phosphorus containing material, which is thought to have developed late in the formation of the crust and upper mantle, and is therefore important to understanding lunar evolution). The GRS was also capable of detecting fast (epithermal) neutrons, which complemented the neutron spectrometer in the search for water on the Moon.

=== Neutron Spectrometer (NS) ===
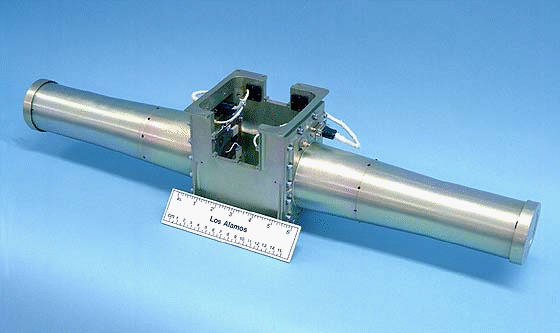
Lunar Prospector Neutron Spectrometer (NS)

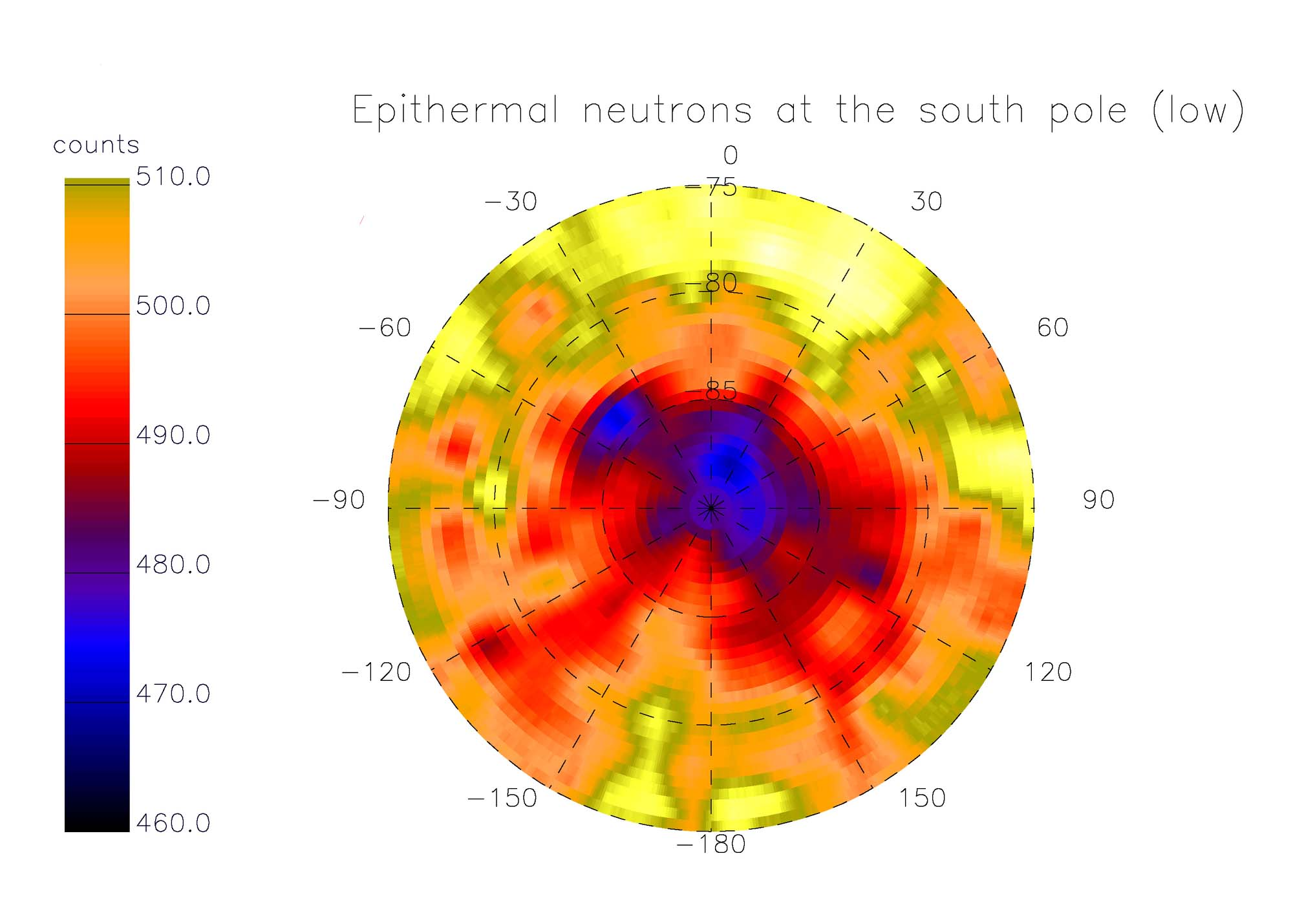
Lunar Prospector Neutron Spectrometer data showing excess hydrogen at the Moon's south pole. Magenta and dark blue show highest hydrogen concentrations.

Based on the Lunar Prospector Neutron Spectrometer (NS) data, mission scientists have determined that there is evidence for lunar water ice in the polar craters of the Moon, an estimated 3 billion tonnes (800 billion US gallons).

The neutron spectrometer was a narrow cylinder colocated with the Alpha Particle Spectrometer at the end of one of the three radial Lunar Prospector science booms. The instrument had a surface resolution of 150 km (93 mi). The neutron spectrometer consisted of two canisters each containing helium-3 and an energy counter. Any thermal neutrons colliding with the helium atoms give an energy signature which can be detected and counted. One of the canisters was wrapped in cadmium, and one in tin. The cadmium screens out thermal (low energy or slow-moving) neutrons, while the tin does not. Thermal neutrons are cosmic-ray-generated neutrons which have lost much of their energy in collisions with hydrogen atoms. Differences in the counts between the two canisters indicate the number of thermal neutrons detected, which in turn indicates the amount of hydrogen in the Moon's crust at a given location. Large quantities of hydrogen would likely be due to the presence of water.

The NS was designed to detect minute amounts of water ice which were believed to exist on the Moon. It was capable of detecting water ice at a level of less than 0.01%. For the polar ice studies, the NS was slated to examine the poles to 80 degrees latitude, with a sensitivity of at least 10 ppm by volume of hydrogen. For the implanted hydrogen studies, the NS was intended to examine the entire globe with a sensitivity of 50 ppmv. The Moon has a number of permanently shadowed craters near the poles with continuous temperatures of −190 °C (−310.0 °F). These craters may act as cold-traps of water from incoming comets and meteoroids. Any water from these bodies which found its way into these craters could become permanently frozen. The NS was also used to measure the abundance of hydrogen implanted by solar wind.

=== The Alpha Particle Spectrometer (APS) ===
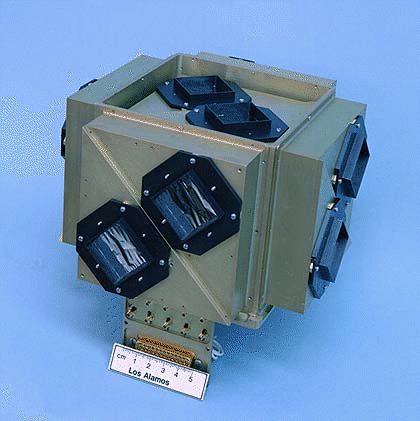
Lunar Prospector Alpha Particle Spectrometer (APS)

The Alpha Particle Spectrometer (APS) was a cube approximately 18 cm (7.1 in) colocated with the neutron spectrometer on the end of one of the three radial 2.5 m (8 ft 2 in) Lunar Prospector science booms. It contained ten silicon detectors sandwiched between gold and aluminum disks arranged on five of six sides of the cube. Alpha particles, produced by the decay of radon and polonium, leave tracks of charge on the silicon wafers when they impact the silicon. A high voltage is applied to the silicon, and the current is amplified by being funneled along the tracks to the aluminum disk and is recorded for identification. The APS was designed to make a global examination of gas release events and polonium distribution with a surface resolution of 150 km (93 mi) and a precision of 10%.

The APS was designed to detect radon outgassing events on the surface of the Moon. The APS recorded alpha particle signatures of radioactive decay of radon gas and its byproduct product, polonium. These putative outgassing events, in which radon, nitrogen, and carbon dioxide are vented, are hypothesized to be the source of the tenuous lunar atmosphere, and may be the result of the low-level volcanic/tectonic activity on the Moon. Information on the existence, timing, and sources of these events may help in a determination of the style and rate of lunar tectonics.

The APS was damaged during launch, ruining one of the five detecting faces. Additionally, due to sunspot activity peaking during the mission, the lunar data was obscured by solar interference. The information was eventually recovered by subtracting out the effects of the solar activity.

=== Doppler Gravity Experiment (DGE) ===
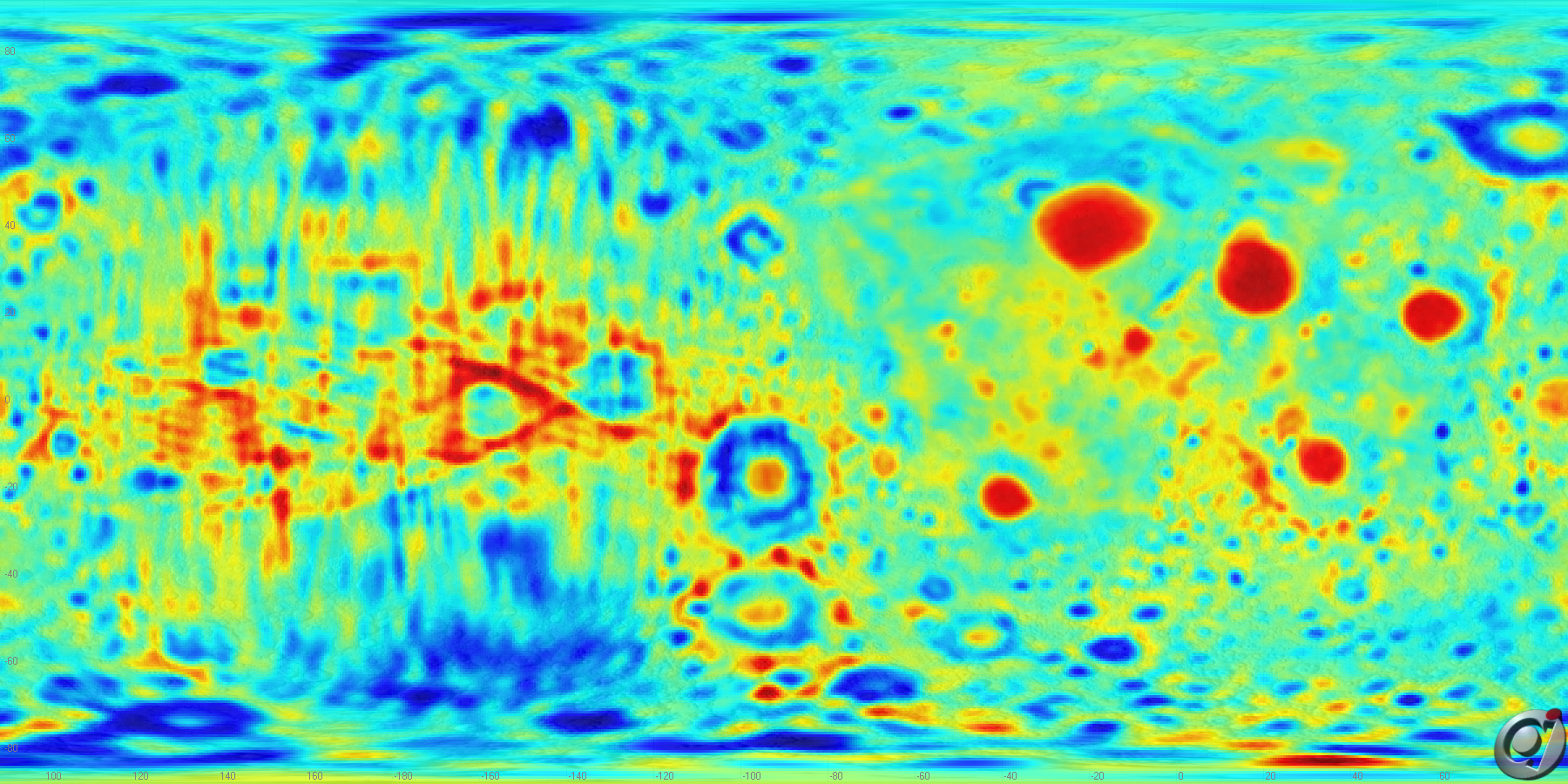
A visualization of the lunar gravity field based on spherical harmonic coefficients determined from Lunar Prospector data. The left side of the image shows the far side of the Moon where the increased uncertainty in the gravity field can be seen.

The Doppler Gravity Experiment (DGE) was the first polar, low-altitude mapping of the lunar gravity field. The Clementine mission had previously produced a relatively low-resolution map, but the Prospector DGE obtained data approximately five times as detailed: the "first truly operational gravity map of the Moon". The practical benefits of this are more stable long-term orbits and better fuel efficiency. Additionally, the DGE data is hoped to help researchers learn more about lunar origins and the nature of the lunar core. The DGE identified three new near-side mass concentration regions.

The purpose of the Lunar Prospector DGE was to learn about the surface and internal mass distribution of the Moon. This is accomplished by measuring the Doppler shift in the S-band tracking signal as it reaches Earth, which can be converted to spacecraft accelerations. The accelerations can be processed to provide estimates of the lunar gravity field, from which the location and size of mass anomalies affecting the spacecraft orbit can be modeled. Estimates of the surface and internal mass distribution give information on the crust, lithosphere, and internal structure of the Moon.

This experiment provided the first lunar gravity data from a low polar orbit. Because line-of-sight tracking was required for this experiment, only the near-side gravity field could be estimated using this Doppler method. The experiment was a byproduct of the spacecraft S band tracking, and so has no listed weight or power requirements. The experiment was designed to give the near-side gravity field with a surface resolution of 200 km (120 mi) and precision of 5 mGal (0.05 mm/s²) in the form of spherical harmonic coefficients to degree and order 60. In the extended mission, in which the spacecraft descended to an orbit with an altitude of 50 km (31 mi) and then to 10 km (6.2 mi), this resolution was expected to improve by a factor of 100 or more.

The downlink telemetry signal was transmitted at 2273 MHz, over a ±1 MHz bandwidth as a right-hand circularly polarized signal at a nominal power of 5 W and peak power of 7 W. Command uplinks were sent at 2093.0542 MHz over a ±1 MHz bandwidth. The transponder was a standard Loral/Conic S-Band transponder. An omnidirectional antenna can be used for uplink and downlink, or a medium gain helix antenna can be used (downlink only). Since the spacecraft was spin-stabilized, the spin resulted in a bias in the Doppler signal due to the spacecraft antenna pattern spinning with respect to the Earth station of 0.417 Hz (27.3 mm/s) for the omnidirectional antenna, and −0.0172 Hz (−1.12 mm/s) for the medium gain antenna. LOS data was sampled at 5 seconds to account for the approximately 5 second spin rate of the spacecraft, leaving a residual of less than 0.1 mm/s.

The detailed data collected has shown that for low lunar orbit the only stable or "frozen orbits" are at inclinations near 27º, 50º, 76º, and 86º.

=== Electron Reflectometer and Magnetometer (MAG/ER) ===
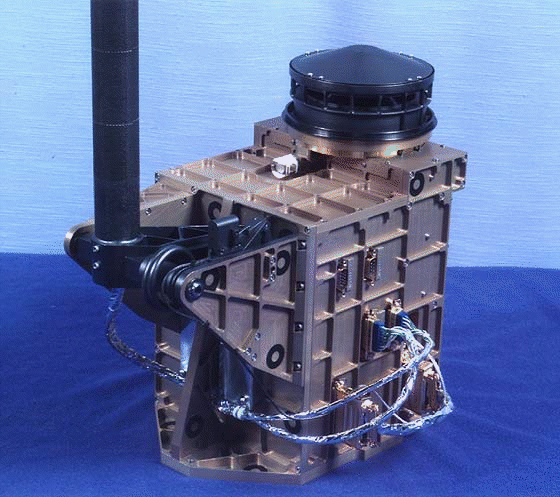
Lunar Prospector Electron Reflectometer (ER)

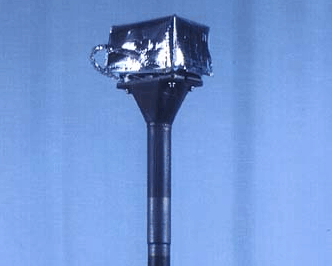
Lunar Prospector Magnetometer (MAG)

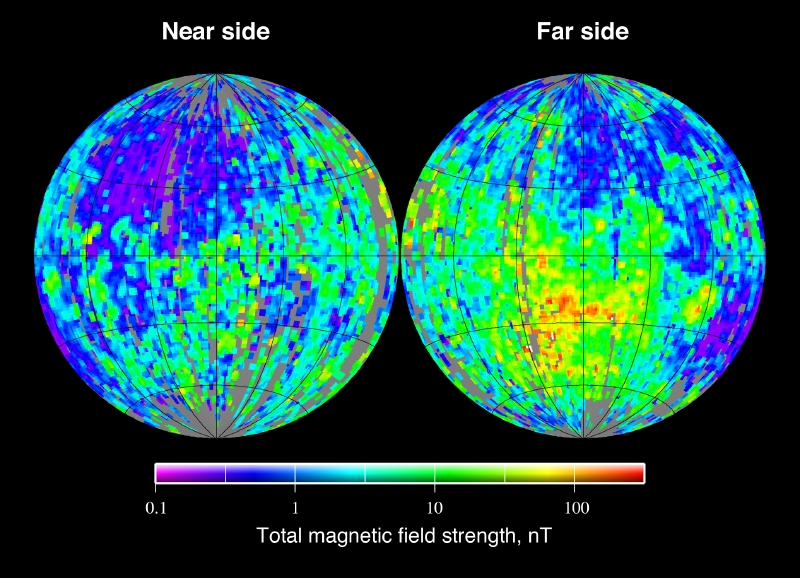
Total magnetic field strength at the surface of the Moon, derived from the electron reflectometer experiment.

The Magnetometer and Electron Reflectometer (collectively, MAG/ER) detected anomalous surface magnetic fields on the Moon, which are in stark contrast to a global magnetosphere (which the Moon lacks). the Moon's overall magnetic field is too weak to deflect the solar wind, but MAG/ER discovered a small surface anomaly that can do so. This anomaly, about 100 km (62 mi) in diameter, has therefore been referred to as "the smallest known magnetosphere, magnetosheath and bow shock system in the Solar System." Due to this and other magnetic features of the Moon's surface, hydrogen deposited by solar wind is non-uniformly distributed, being denser at the periphery of the magnetic features. Since hydrogen density is a desirable characteristic for hypothetical lunar bases, this information may be useful in choosing optimal sites for possible long-term Moon missions.

The electron reflectometer (ER) and magnetometer (MAG) were designed to collect information on the lunar magnetic fields. the Moon has no global magnetic field, but it does have weak localized magnetic fields at its surface. These may be paleomagnetic remnants of a former global magnetic field, or may be due to meteor impacts or other local phenomena. This experiment was to help map these fields and provide information on their origins, allow possible examination of distribution of minerals on the lunar surface, aid in a determination of the size and composition of the lunar core, and provide information on the lunar induced magnetic dipole.

The ER determined the location and strength of magnetic fields from the energy spectrum and direction of electrons. The instrument measured the pitch angles of solar wind electrons reflected from the Moon by lunar magnetic fields. Stronger local magnetic fields can reflect electrons with larger pitch angles. Field strengths as small as 0.01 nT could be measured with a spatial accuracy of about 3 km (1.9 mi) at the lunar surface. The MAG was a triaxial fluxgate magnetometer similar in design to the instrument used on Mars Global Surveyor. It could measure the magnetic field amplitude and direction at spacecraft altitude with a spatial resolution of about 100 km (62 mi) when ambient plasma disturbances are minimal.

The ER and the electronics package were located at the end of one of the three radial science booms on Lunar Prospector. The MAG was in turn extended further on a 0.8 m (2 ft 7 in) boom—a combined 2.6 m (8 ft 6 in) from Lunar Prospector in order to isolate it from spacecraft generated magnetic fields. The ER and MAG instruments had a combined mass of 5 kg (11 lb) and used 4.5 watts of power.

== See also ==
- Lunar resources
- Luna-Glob, a current Russian lander program
- Prospector (spacecraft)
- Resource Prospector (rover)
- List of artificial objects on the Moon
