= Igors =

Igors is a given name. Notable people with the name include:

- Igors Kazakēvičs (born 1980), Latvian race walker
- Igors Kazanovs (born 1963), retired athlete who represented the USSR and later Latvia
- Igors Korabļovs (born 1974), Latvian football (soccer) defender
- Igors Kozlovs (born 1987), football midfielder from Latvia
- Igors Miglinieks (born 1964), Latvian basketball player
- Igors Pavlovs (born 1965), professional ice hockey player
- Igors Sļesarčuks (born 1976), football striker from Latvia
- Igors Savčenkovs (born 1982), football defender from Latvia
- Igors Semjonovs (born 1985), football midfielder from Latvia
- Igors Sokolovs (born 1974), Latvian hammer thrower
- Igors Stepanovs (born 1976), Latvian football defender
- Igors Troickis (born 1969), former football defender from Latvia
- Igors Vihrovs (born 1978), Latvian gymnast

== See also ==
- Igor (disambiguation)
- Igor (given name)
