= Igor =

Igor may refer to:

- Igor (given name), an East Slavic given name and a list of people with the name

== Arts, entertainment, and media ==
- Igor (character), a stock character
- Igors (Discworld), a fictional humanoid family in the Discworld book series by Terry Pratchett
- Igor (album), a 2019 album by Tyler, the Creator
- Igor (film), a 2008 American animated film
- Igor: Objective Uikokahonia, a 1994 Spanish MS-DOS PC video game

== Computing ==
- Igor Engraver, a music notation computer program
- IGOR Pro, a computer program for scientific data analysis

== Other uses ==
- Igor (crater), a tiny crater in the Mare Imbrium region of the Moon
- Igor (walrus), a walrus that lived in the Dolfinarium Harderwijk
- Igor Naming Agency, an American naming agency
- Hurricane Igor, a 2010 Atlantic storm
