= Luna 17 =

1970 Soviet uncrewed lunar mission

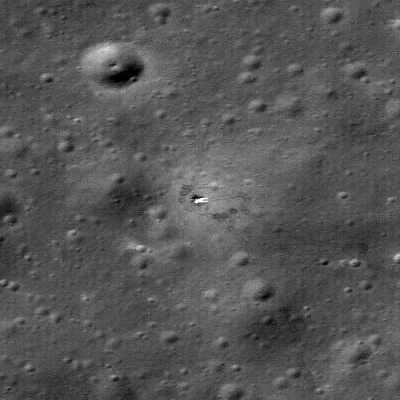
- Luna 17 imaged by the LRO in 2010
- Mission type: Planetary Science
- Operator: Soviet space program
- COSPAR ID: 1970-095A
- SATCAT no.: 04691
- Mission duration: 308 days

Spacecraft properties
- Manufacturer: GSMZ Lavochkin
- Launch mass: 5,700 kg (12,600 lb)

Start of mission
- Launch date: 14:44:01, 10 November 1970 (UTC)
- Rocket: Proton 8K82K with Blok D upper stage
- Launch site: Baikonur Cosmodrome

End of mission
- Last contact: 13:05, 14 September 1971 (UTC)

Moon orbiter
- Orbital insertion: 15 November 1970

Moon lander
- Landing date: 03:46:50, 17 November 1970
- Landing site: 38.28°N 35.0°W

Moon rover
- Spacecraft component: Lunokhod 1
- Landing date: 06:28, 17 November 1970
- Distance driven: 10.54 km (6.55 mi)
Instruments
- Photographic imaging system
- X-ray spectrometer
- Penetrometer
- Laser reflector
- Radiation detectors
- X-ray telescope
- Odometer/Speedometer

Luna 17 (Ye-8 series) was an uncrewed space mission of the Luna program, also called Lunik 17. It deployed the first robotic rover onto the surface of the Moon.

== Launch ==
Luna 17 was launched from the Baikonur cosmodrome on 10 November 1970. A Proton K launch vehicle brought the spacecraft to a parking orbit around the Earth. The upper stage of the launch vehicle then sent the spacecraft through trans-lunar injection. Luna 17 inserted into orbit around the Moon on 15 November. The spacecraft softly landed in Mare Imbrium (the Sea of Rains) on 17 November 1970.

== Payload ==
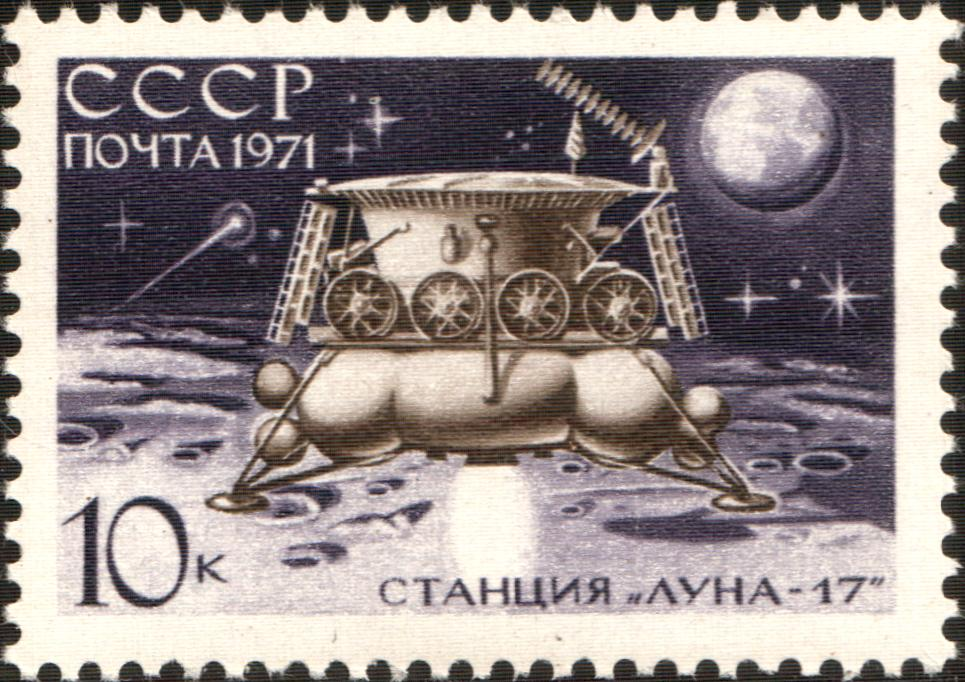
Commemorative stamp depicting Luna 17 with Lunokhod 1 Rover

The spacecraft had dual ramps by which the payload, Lunokhod 1, descended to the lunar surface. Lunokhod 1 was a lunar vehicle formed of a tub-like compartment with a large convex lid on eight independently powered wheels. Lunokhod 1 was equipped with a cone-shaped antenna, a highly directional helical antenna, four teleray spectrometer, an x-ray telescope, cosmic-ray detectors, and a laser retro-reflector (supplied by France) was also included. The vehicle was powered by a solar cell array mounted on the underside of the lid.

Lunokhod 1 was intended to operate through three lunar days but actually operated for eleven lunar days (eleven Earth months). The operations of Lunokhod officially ceased on 4 October 1971, the anniversary of Sputnik 1, after having traveled over 10.5 kilometres (6.5 miles) while taking pictures and performing numerous tests.

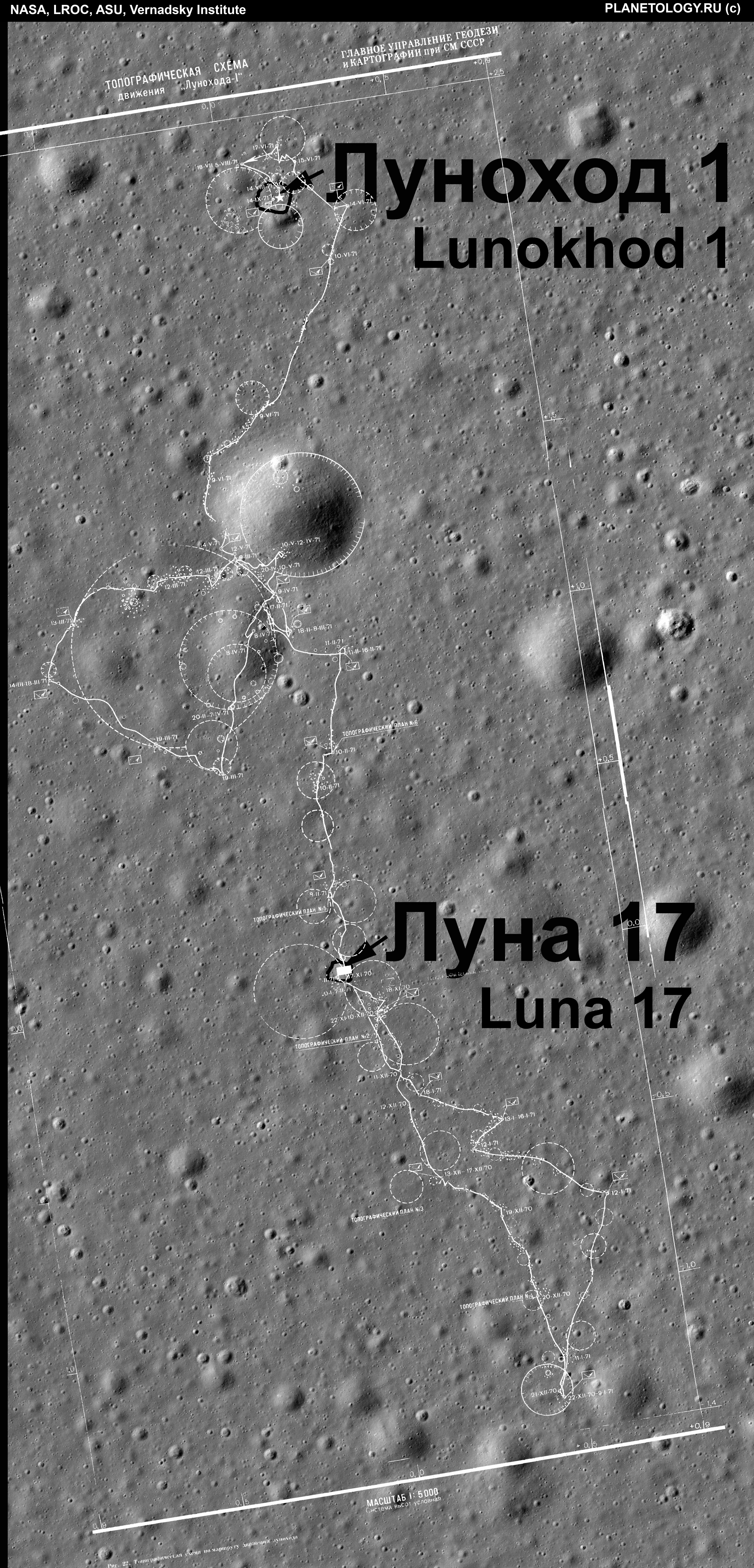
Luna 17 and Lunokhod 1 landing site photographed by LRO

Luna 17 continued the spate of successes in Soviet lunar exploration begun by Luna 16 and Zond 8. Luna 17 carried Lunokhod 1, the first in a series of robot lunar roving vehicles whose conception had begun in the early 1960s, originally as part of the piloted lunar landing operations. This was the second attempt to land such a vehicle on the Moon after a failure in February 1969.

The descent stage was equipped with two landing ramps for the rover, to disembark onto the Moon's surface.

The 756-kilogram (1,666-pound-11-ounce) rover stood about 1.35 metres (4 feet 5 inches) high and was 2.15 metres (7 feet 1 inch) across. Each of its eight wheels could be controlled independently for two forward and two reverse speeds. Its top speed was about 100 metres per hour (0.062 mph), with commands issued by a five-man team of "drivers" on Earth who had to deal with the 5-second delay. The set of scientific instruments was powered by solar cells (installed on the inside of the hinged top lid of the rover) and chemical batteries.

After two mid-course corrections en route to the Moon, Luna 17 entered lunar orbit and then landed on the lunar surface at 03:46:50 UT on 17 November 1970 at 38°17' north latitude and 35° west longitude, about 2,500 kilometres (1,600 miles) from the Luna 16 site in the Sea of Rains.

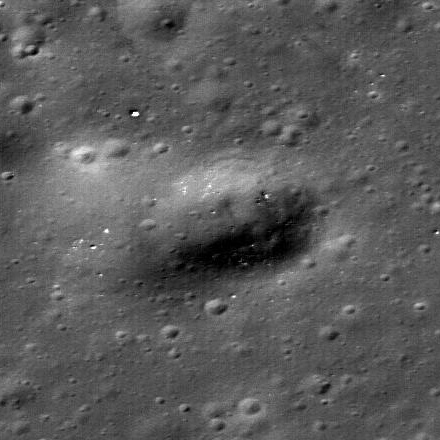
Leonid crater, with Lunokhod-1 at the upper left

The Lunokhod 1 rover rolled over the ramps and onto the lunar surface at 06:28 UT. During its 322 Earth days of operation, the rover traveled 10.54 kilometres (7 miles) and returned more than 20,000 TV images and 206 high-resolution panoramas.

In addition, Lunokhod 1 performed twenty-five soil analyses with its RIFMA X-ray fluorescence spectrometer and used its penetrometer at 500 different locations.

Controllers finished the last communications session with Lunokhod 1 at 13:05 UT on 14 September 1971. Attempts to reestablish contact were finally discontinued on 4 October.

In March 2010, the Lunar Reconnaissance Orbiter photographed the landing site of Luna 17, showing the lander and tracks of the rover. In April 2010, the Apache Point Observatory Lunar Laser-ranging Operation team announced that with the aid of these photos, they had found the long-lost Lunokhod 1 rover and had received returns from the laser retroreflector.

== See also ==
- Lunokhod 1
- Lunokhod programme
- List of artificial objects on the Moon
- List of missions to the Moon
