= Gena (crater) =

Crater on the Moon

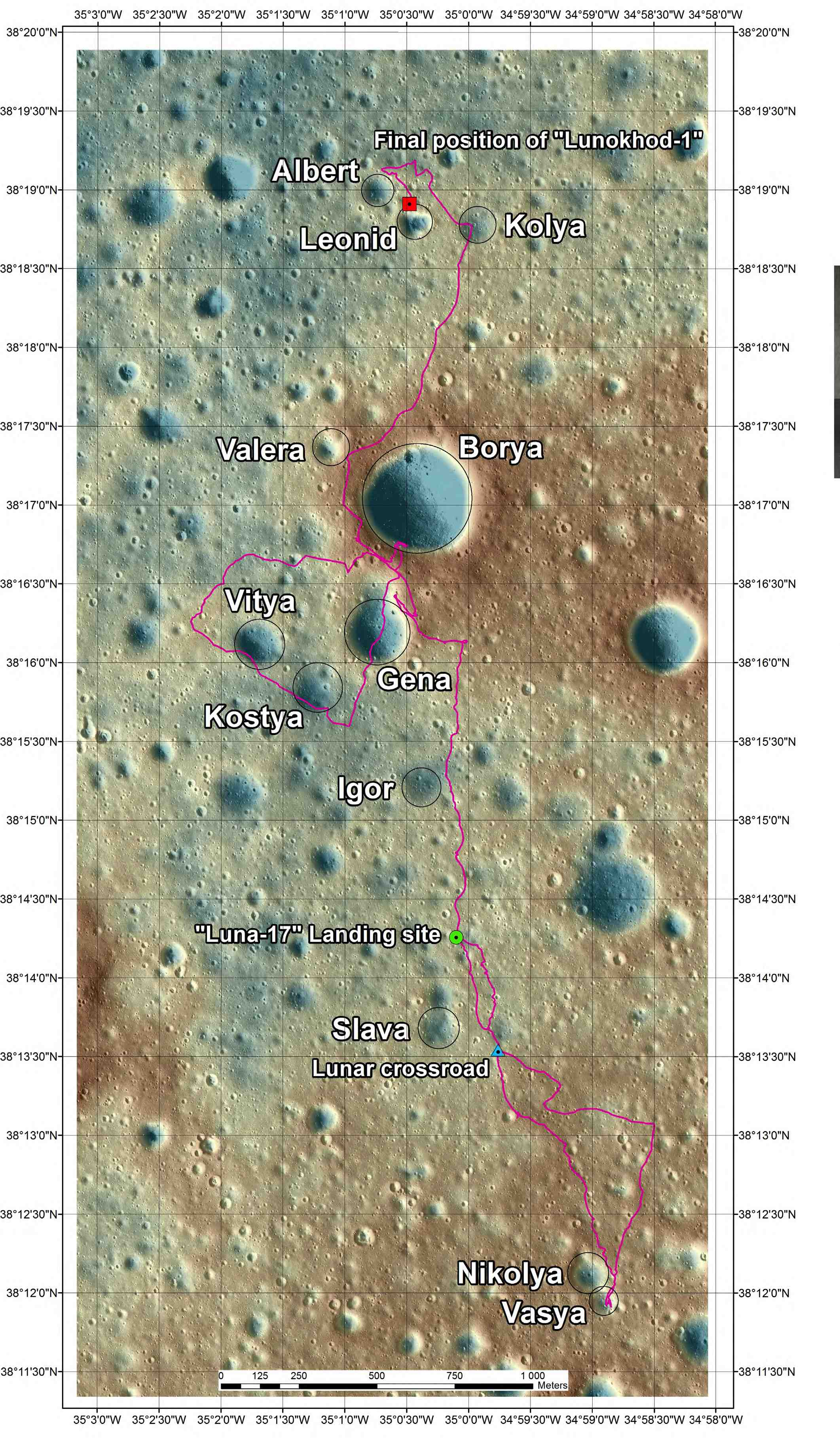
- Map of the minor features that the rover Lunokhod-1 passed, Gena is in the middle of the photo
- Coordinates: 38.271°N 35.012°W
- Diameter: c. 200 m
- Depth: Unknown
- Eponym: Russian male name of Greek origin

Gena is a crater on the Moon. It is near the site where Soviet lunar rover Lunokhod 1 landed in November 1970, in the Mare Imbrium region. Its diameter is 0.2 km. The name Gena does not refer to a specific person; it is a male name of Russian origin, a diminutive form of Gennady.

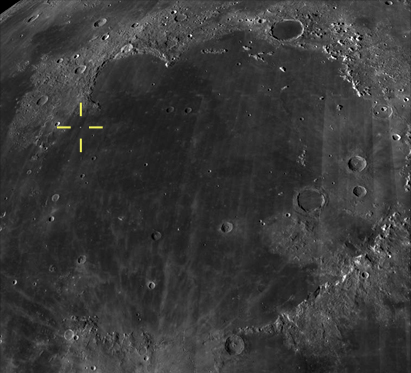
Gena is one of twelve named craters near the landing site, located in the northwest of Mare Imbrium

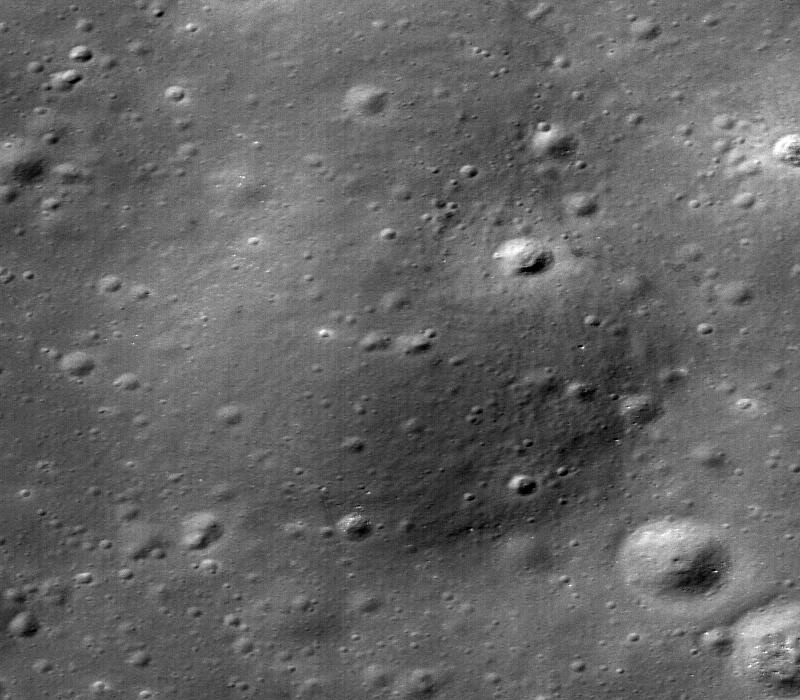
LRO image
