= Borya (crater) =

Crater on the Moon

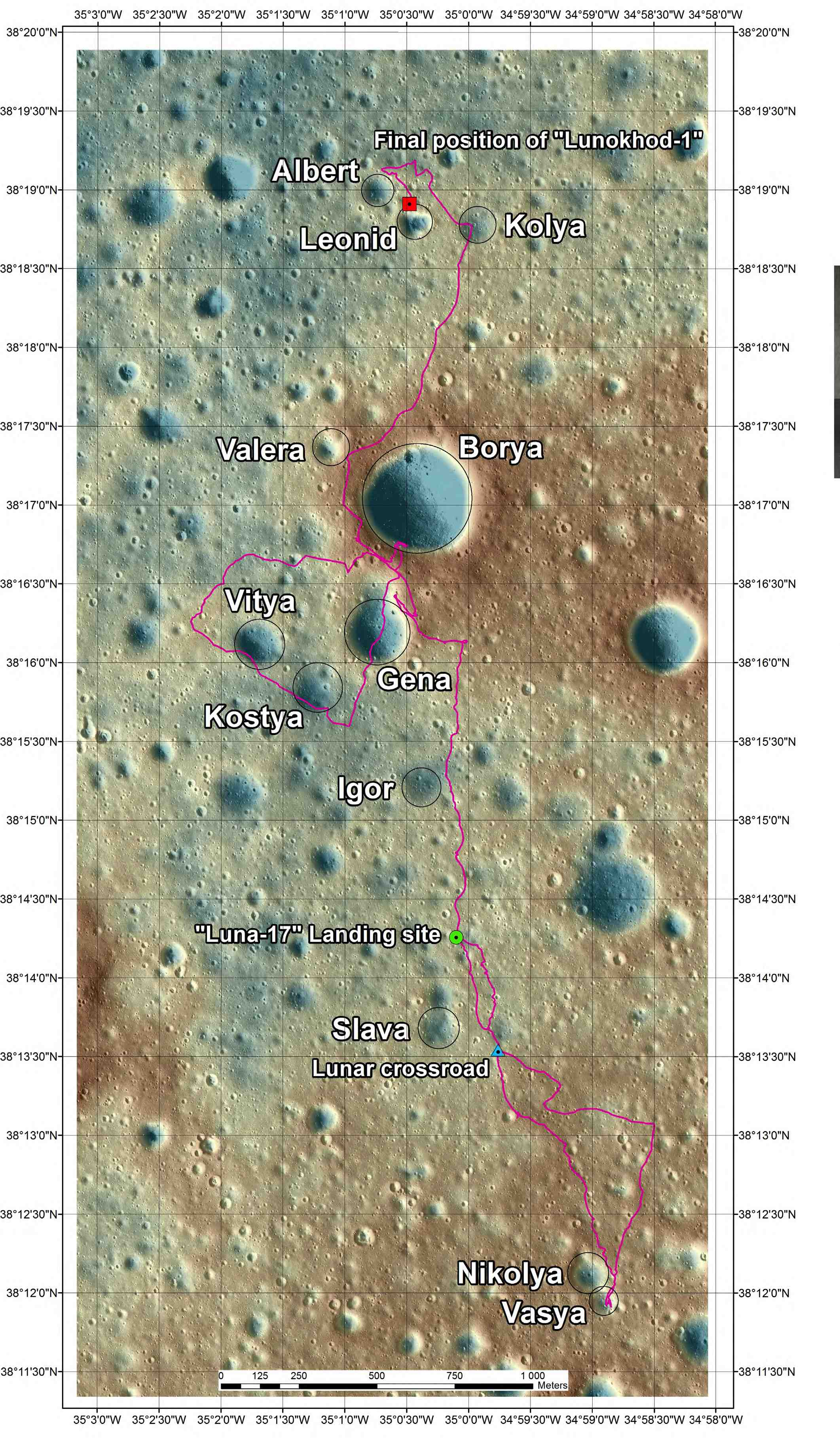
- Map of the minor features that the rover Lunokhod-1 passed, Borya is above the middle of the picture
- Coordinates: 38.2845°N 35.007°W
- Diameter: 400 m (1,300 ft)
- Eponym: Russian male name

Borya is a tiny crater on the Moon. It is near the site where Soviet lunar rover Lunokhod 1 landed in November 1970, in the Mare Imbrium region. Its diameter is 400 m (1,300 ft). The name Borya does not refer to a specific person; it is a male name of Russian origin, the diminutive form of Boris.

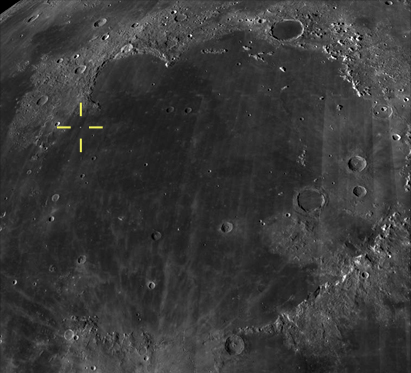
Borya is one of twelve named craters near the landing site of Luna 17, located in the northwest of Mare Imbrium

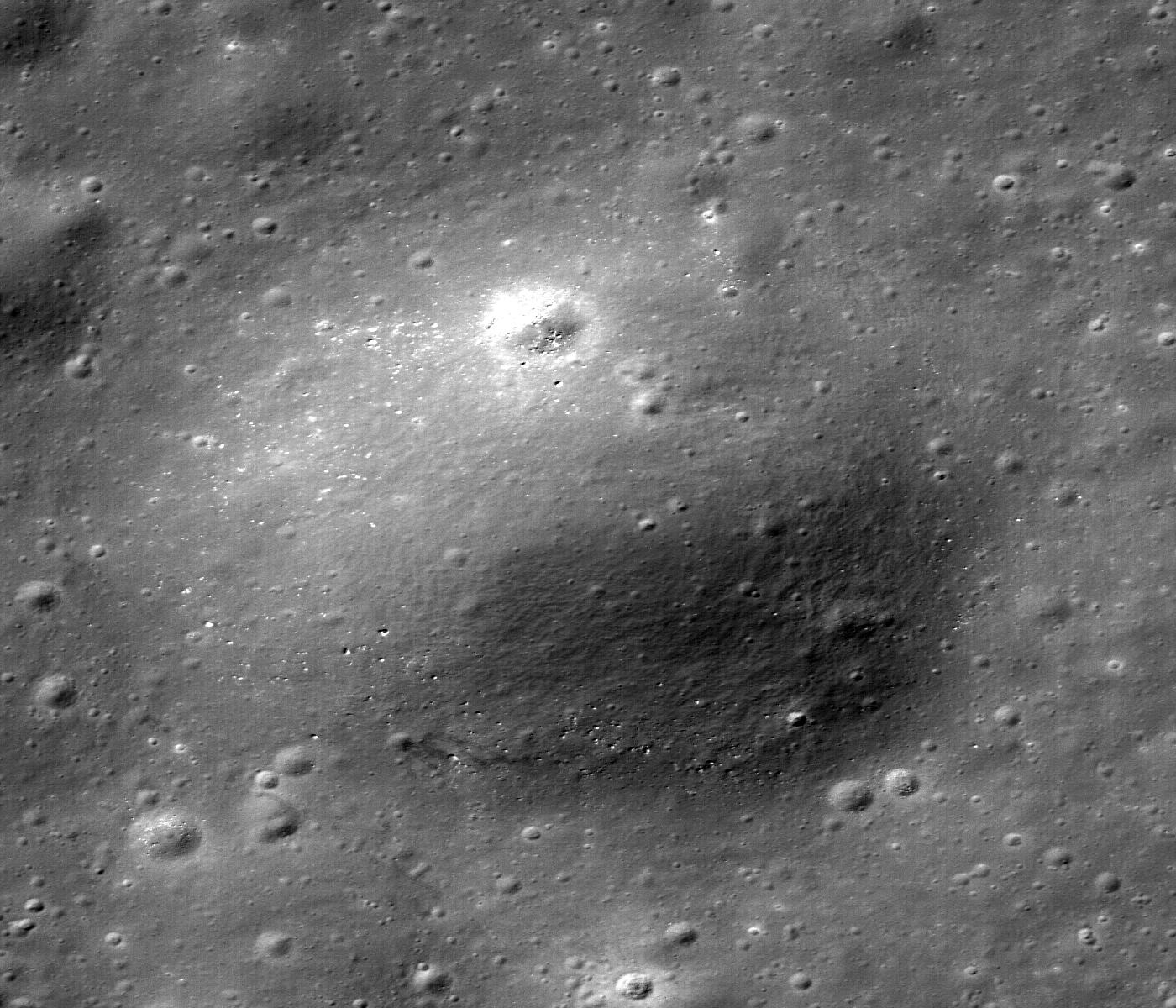
LRO image
