= Kolya (crater) =

Crater on the Moon

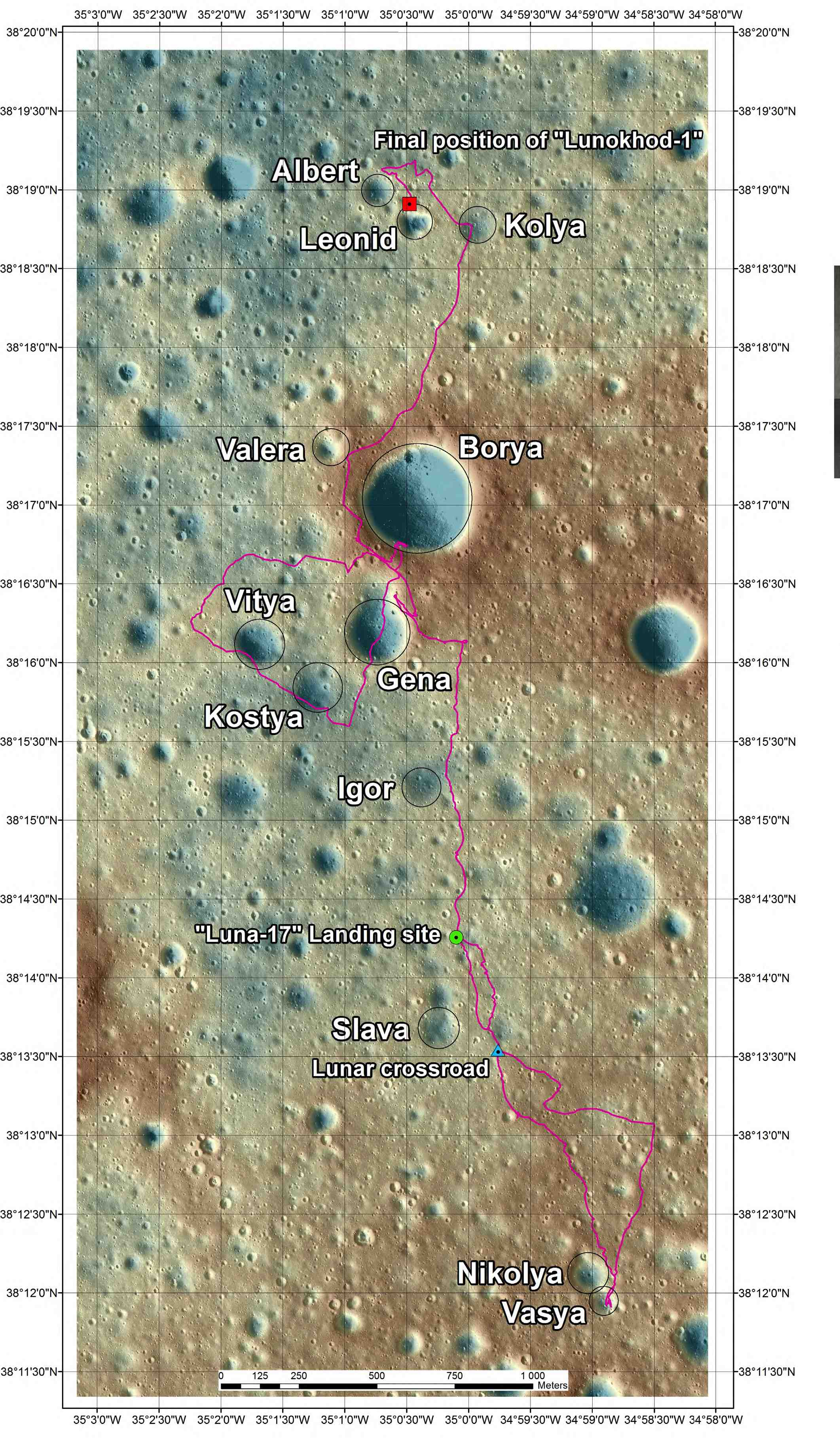
- Map of the minor features that the rover Lunokhod-1 passed
- Coordinates: 38.3128°N 34.9975°W
- Diameter: 0.14 km
- Eponym: Russian male name

Kolya is a tiny crater on the Moon. It is near the site where Soviet lunar rover Lunokhod 1 landed in November 1970, in the Mare Imbrium region. Its diameter is 0.14 km. The name Kolya does not refer to a specific person; it is a male name of Russian origin, a diminutive form of Nikolai.

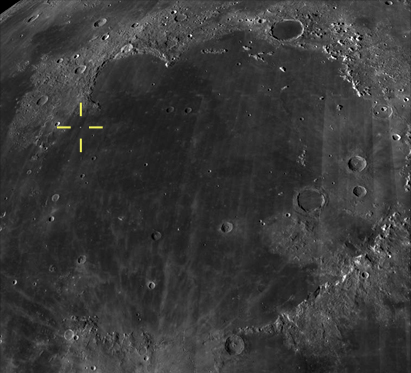
Kolya is one of twelve named craters near the landing site, located in the northwest of Mare Imbrium

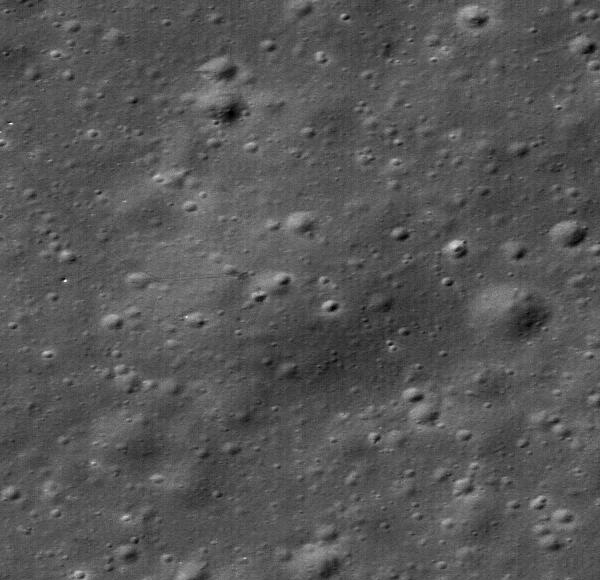
LRO image
