= Tom Murphy (physicist) =

Tom Murphy (born January 9, 1970) is a professor of physics at the University of California, San Diego. He is the project investigator for the Apache Point Observatory Lunar Laser-ranging Operation Project. Professor Murphy completed his Ph.D. in astrophysics at the California Institute of Technology after which he completed a postdoc at the University of Washington - Seattle before becoming a professor at the University of California, San Diego. In 2010 his group was responsible for locating the former Soviet Union's Lunokhod 1 rover.

== Blog "Do The Math" ==
Murphy is also known for his blog "Do The Math" which examines societal issues related to energy production, climate change, and economic growth from an astrophysicist's perspective.

In 2011, Murphy calculated the usefulness of Gravity battery concepts, like stacking blocks of concrete, and came to the conclusion that gravitational storage is incredibly weak compared to chemical, compressed air, or flywheel techniques.

In 2021 Dr. Murphy published Energy and Human Ambitions on a Finite Planet textbook, a physics open educational resource (OER) that includes a version optimized for printing.
