= Nikolya (crater) =

Crater on the Moon

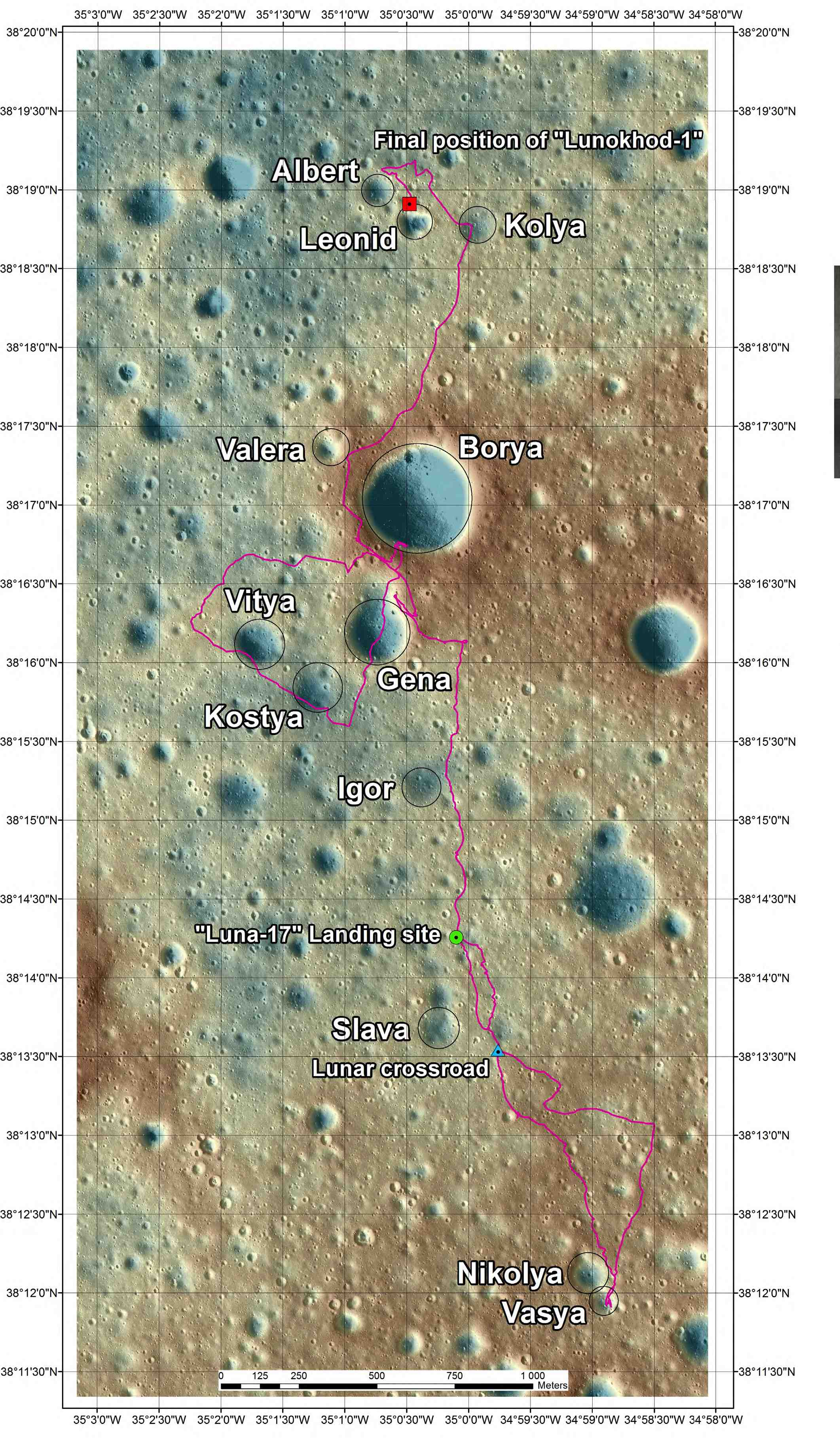
- Map of the minor features that the rover Lunokhod-1 passed
- Coordinates: 38.20205°N 34.9984°W
- Diameter: 0.12 km
- Eponym: Russian male name

Nikolya is a tiny crater on the Moon. It is near the site where Soviet lunar rover Lunokhod 1 landed in November 1970, in the Mare Imbrium region. Its diameter is 0.12 km. The name Nikolya does not refer to a specific person; it is a male name of Russian origin, a diminutive form of Nikolai.

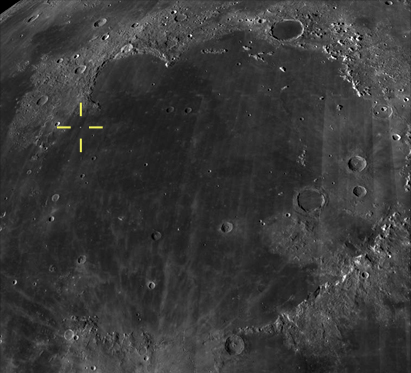
Nikolya is one of twelve named craters near the landing site, located in the northwest of Mare Imbrium

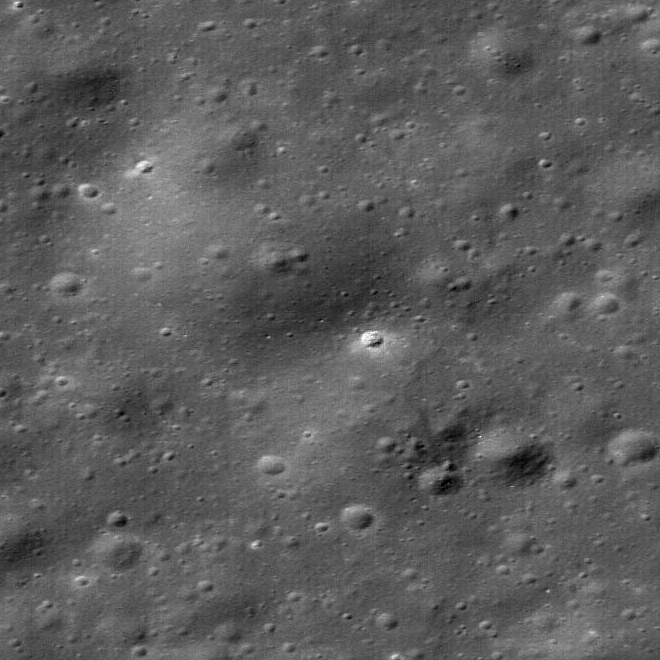
LRO image of Nikolya and Vasya craters

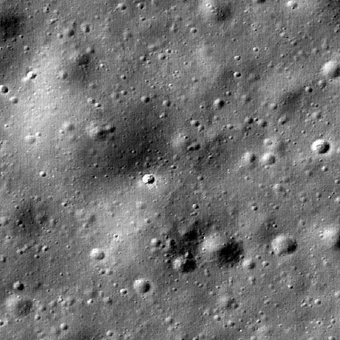
Another LRO image of Nikolya and Vasya craters
