= Albert (crater) =

Crater on the Moon

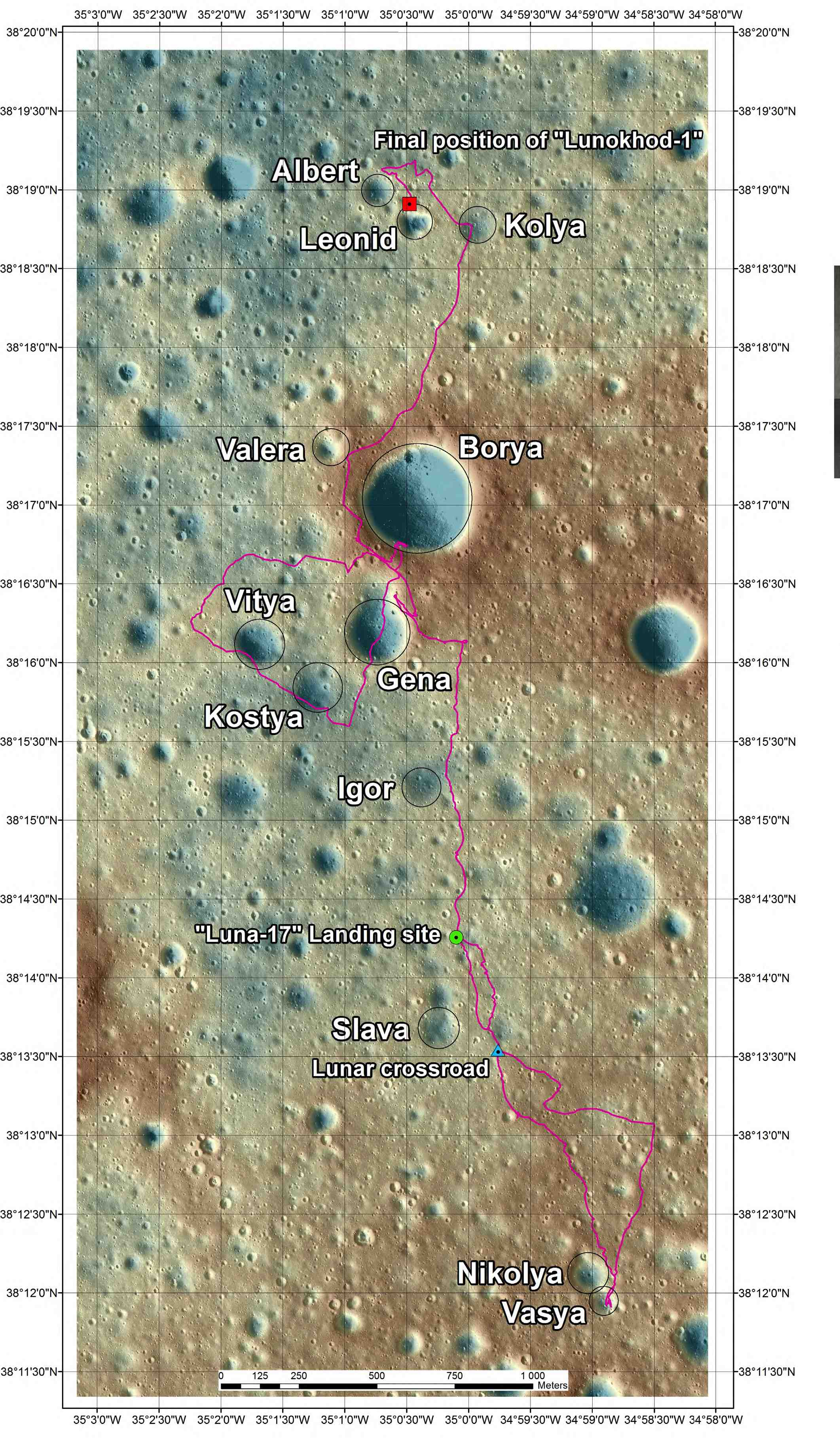
- Map of the minor features that the rover Lunokhod-1 passed, Albert is near the top of the photo
- Coordinates: 38.31665°N 35.0012°W
- Diameter: 100 m (330 ft)
- Eponym: Germanic originated male name

Albert is a tiny crater on the Moon. It is near the site where Soviet lunar rover Lunokhod 1 landed in November 1970, in the Mare Imbrium region. Its diameter is 100 meters. The name Albert does not refer to a specific person; it is a male name of German origin.

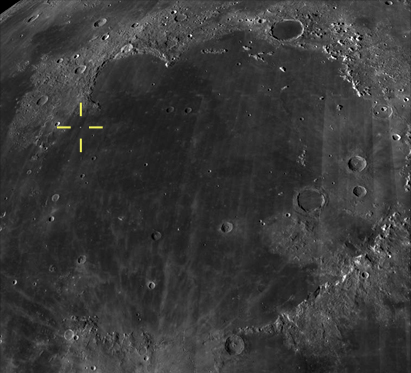
Albert is one of twelve named craters near the landing site, located in the northwest of Mare Imbrium

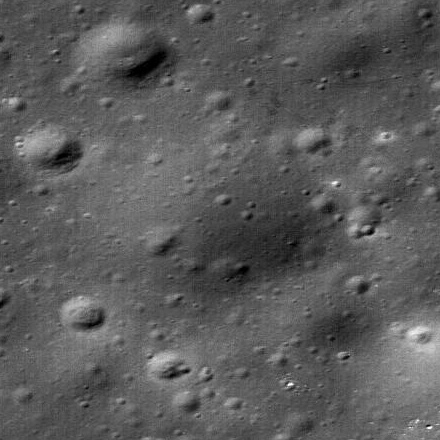
LRO image
