= Leonid (crater) =

Crater on the Moon

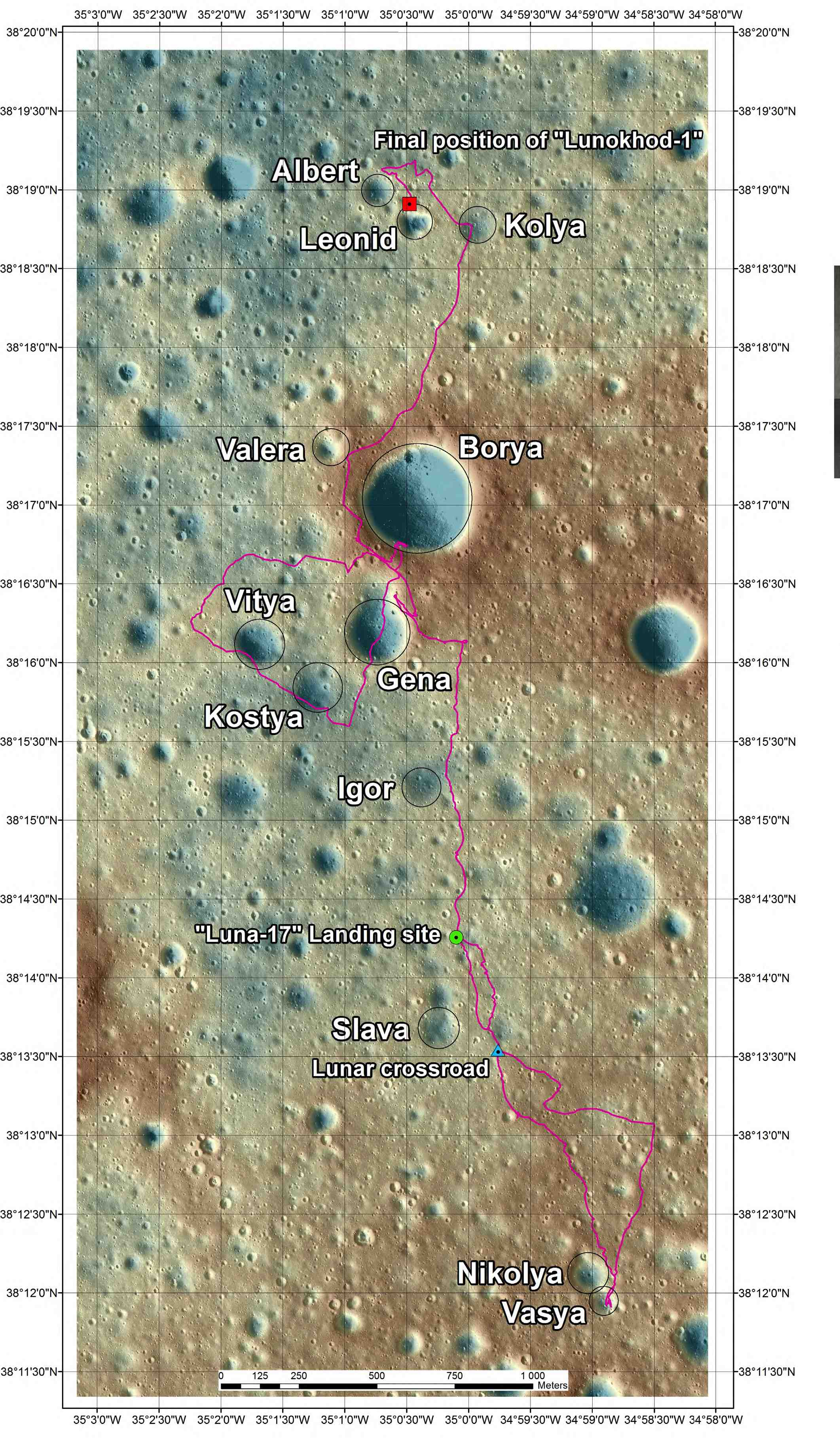
- Map of the minor features that the rover Lunokhod-1 passed, Leonid is near the top of the photo
- Coordinates: 38.311°N 35.007°W
- Diameter: 0.12 km
- Eponym: Russian male name

Leonid is a tiny crater on the Moon. It is near the site where Soviet lunar rover Lunokhod 1 landed in November 1970, in the Mare Imbrium region. Its diameter is 0.12 km. The name Leonid does not refer to a specific person; it is a Russian male name of Greek origin.

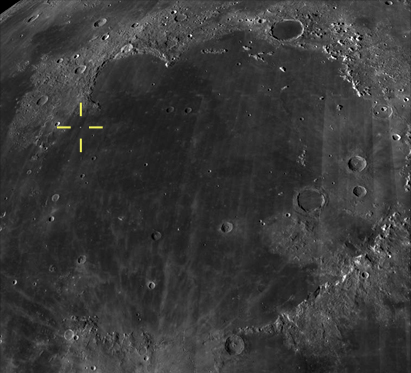
Leonid is one of twelve named craters near the landing site, located in the northwest of Mare Imbrium

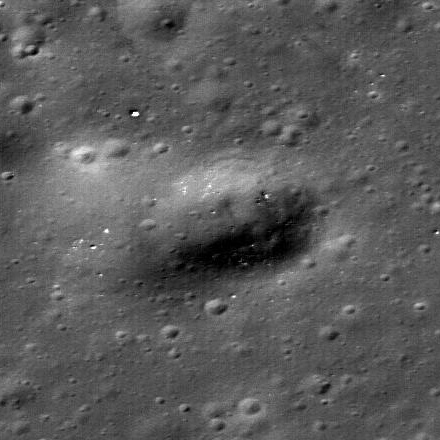
LRO image, with the Lunokhod rover in upper left
