= Igor (crater) =

Crater on the Moon

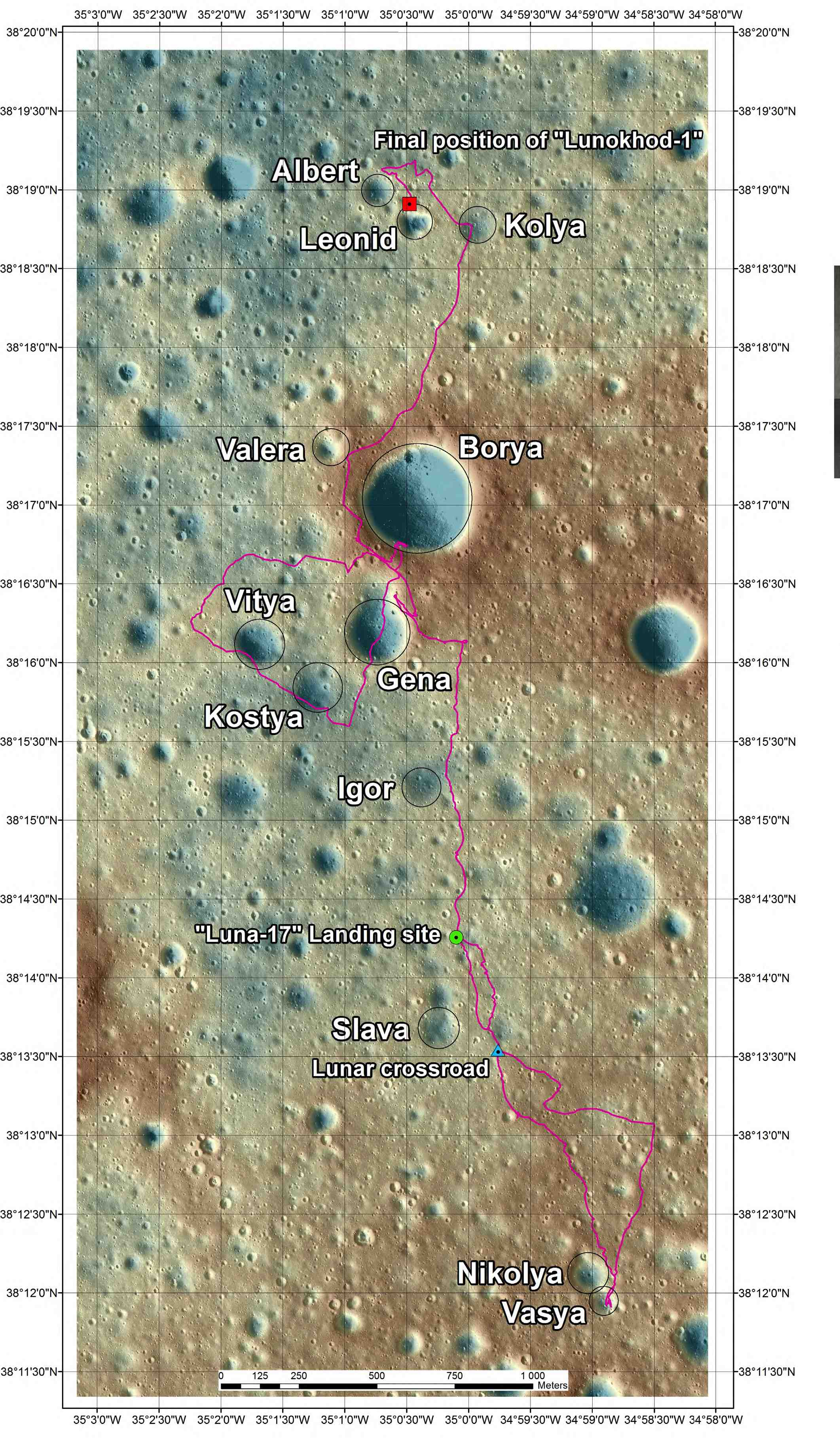
- Map of the minor features that the rover Lunokhod-1 passed, Igor is in the middle of the photo
- Coordinates: 38.2504°N 34.0315°W
- Diameter: 0.1 km
- Eponym: Russian male name of Norse origin

Igor is a tiny crater on the Moon. It is near the site where Soviet lunar rover Lunokhod 1 landed in November 1970, in the Mare Imbrium region. Its diameter is 0.1 km. The name Igor does not refer to a specific person; it is a Russian male name, derived from the Norse name Ingvar.

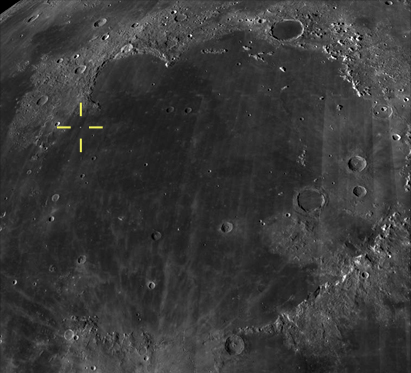
Igor is one of twelve named craters near the landing site, located in the northwest of Mare Imbrium

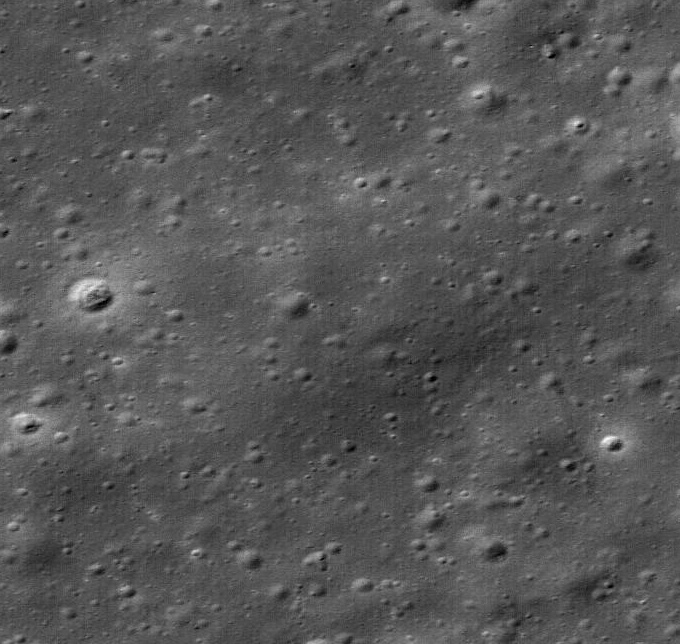
LRO image
