= Igor Naming Agency =

American naming agency

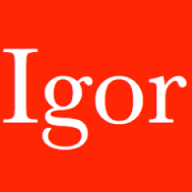
- Company type: Private
- Industry: Naming
- Founded: 2002; 24 years ago
- Founders: Jay Jurisich; Steve Manning
- Headquarters: Sausalito, California, United States
- Area served: Worldwide
- Key people: Steve Manning, CEO, managing director
- Website: igorinternational.com

Igor Naming Agency is an American naming agency. Based in Sausalito, California, Igor is known for its "almost militant embrace" of using real and natural-sounding words in naming. Among others, the company has named Gogo Inflight, Cutthroat Kitchen, TruTV, the Aria Resort, and consumer products for The North Face and Target.

== History ==
Igor Naming Agency was founded by Jay Jurisich and Steve Manning, who met while working at the Sausalito naming agency, A Hundred Monkeys. In addition to naming, Jurisich and Manning worked with agency founder Danny Altman to create The Shinolas, an annual award given to the year's worst brand name. Judged by Ben Cohen of Ben and Jerry's, Jerry Harrison of Talking Heads, Bob Camp, co-creator of Ren & Stimpy and others, Shinolas were awarded to products including the Oldsmobile Achieva, and Cruex, a cream to soothe itches.

Jurisich and Manning left A Hundred Monkeys in 2002 to co-found Igor Naming Agency. In addition to established companies including Nokia, EA Sports, and MTV, Igor worked extensively with companies founded following the dot-com downturn of 2000. They advised against the industry-standard practices of using invented words, convening focus groups for market research, and choosing company and product names based on the availability of a URL.

In late 2002, Igor launched Snark Hunting, a blog about company names, product names and the impact of naming and branding on popular culture. As more blogs related to branding began to appear online, Fast Company wrote: "The best stuff comes from Snark Hunting," highlighting a post which "riffed on The Gap's new Forth & Towne store concept for middle-aged women, noting that it uses an ampersand rather than risk the acronym FAT."

In 2004, Jurisich and Manning co-wrote Building the Perfect Beast: The Igor Naming Guide. Regularly updated, it is available as a free download. It has been used as a resource in academic settings as well as by B2C companies, startups, and incubators.

Jurisich left Igor in 2011 to found Zinzin, also a naming agency. Manning has served as CEO and managing director since Jurisich's departure.
