= Galactic Suite Design =

Spanish aerospace design company

- Type: Private
- Predecessor: Galactic Suite Limited
- Founded: 2007
- Founder: Xavier Claramunt
- Headquarters: Barcelona, Spain

Galactic Suite Design is an aerospace design company based in Barcelona, Spain. The company develops concepts and designs for aerospace projects. The company became well known for its announcement of the Galactic Suite Space Resort, a cancelled plan to create an orbital space station.

Galactic Suite Design was the lead company in the consortium of companies fielding the Barcelona Moon Team, a competitor for the Google Lunar X Prize, with a Moon launch scheduled for 2014.

== History ==
=== Galactic Suite Space Resort ===
The Galactic Suite Space Resort is a cancelled 2007 concept proposal for an orbital space station.

The Galactic Suite Space Resort space station began as a hobby for Xavier Claramunt, architect and director of Galactic Suite Design. The station reportedly entered development after an unnamed space enthusiast invested US$3 billion to build it. An unnamed American company with the goal of colonising Mars assisted in some of the early stages of the project, and discussions with additional private investors from Japan, the United States and the United Arab Emirates have taken place.

2006 illustration of an early design for the Galactic Suite Space Resort alongside a Space Shuttle.

Early design concepts called for a central hub with a dozen modules radiating outwards, providing an indefinite number of bedrooms for several customers at a time. Claramunt said that while it would be a challenge to design a bathroom that works in microgravity, showers might be taken in a spa room with bubbles of floating water. The issue of moving around in space would be solved by having guests wear suits of Velcro for sticking to the module walls, similar to its use in the film 2001: A Space Odyssey. The station was to conceivably orbit the Earth once every 90 minutes, providing 16 day-and-night cycles every 24 hours.

The company stated in 2010 that a three-day stay was projected to cost US$4 million per customer. Company studies found that 40,000 people worldwide were capable of affording such a stay. The project was supposed to have included an "astronaut training center" and spaceport.

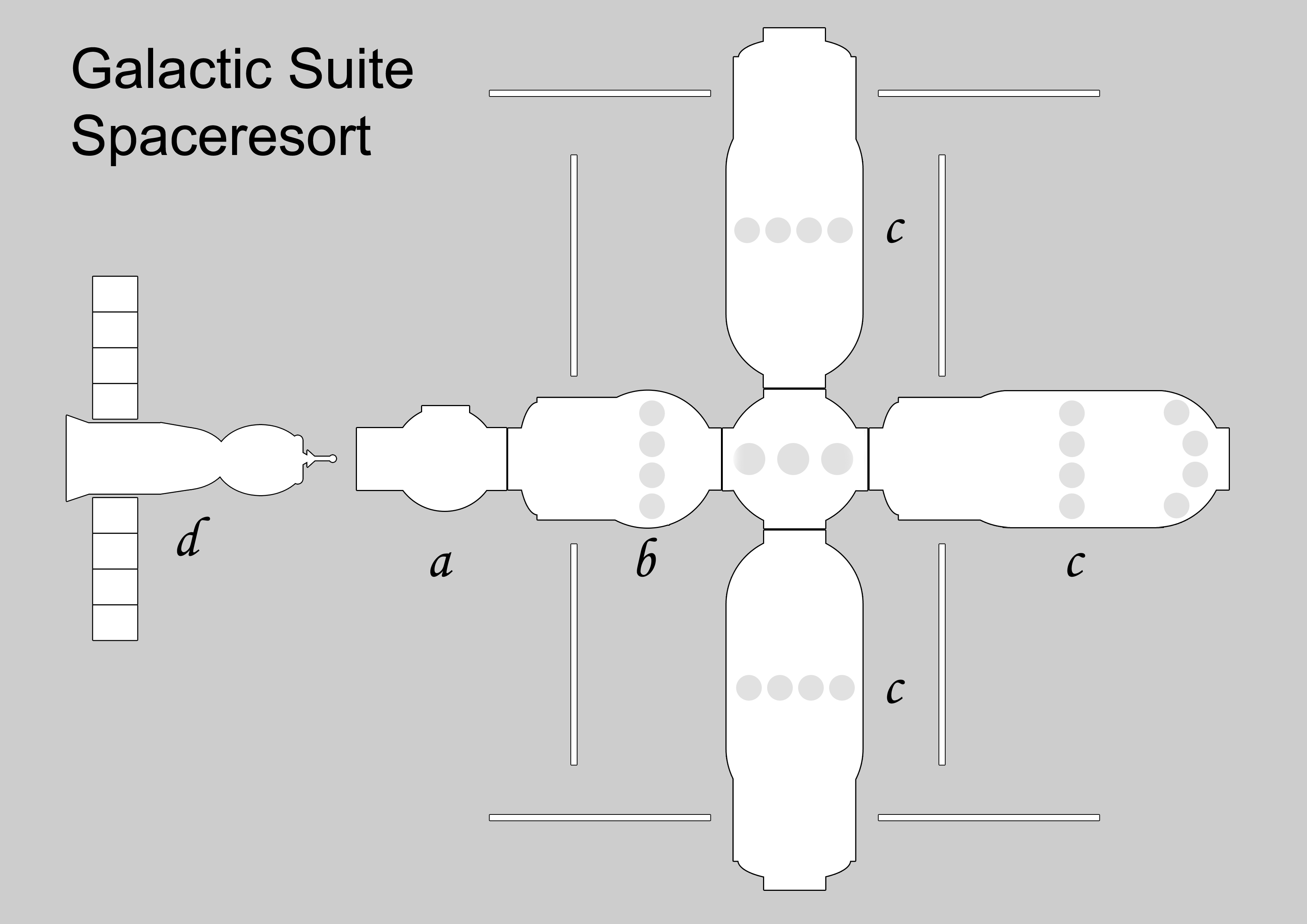
One of the proposed configurations for GS Spaceresort. a - main docking node and EVA hatch; b - administration / service module; c - living / suite modules; d - crewed ferry

In 2008, Claramunt stated that construction of the station would begin in October of that year, and that European company EADS Astrium would be the contractor in charge of building the modules and other equipment. However, Astrium denied any involvement in the project. In November 2010, the company announced that a first phase would bring into orbit a single modified ATV module for a cost of €400 million, while a second phase would increase the total number of modules up to four in a cross configuration.

Some experts, including Thomas Bouvet (International Astronautical Federation), Mark Homnick (4Frontiers) and Juan de Dalmau (Centro Tecnológico para la Industria Aeronáutica y del Espacio) expressed skepticism about the project, raising concerns that Galactic Suite would be unable to meet the 2012 goal because no hardware had been built and tested, and that no rocket system was available to transport guests to the station. The investment was also predicted to have fallen short of the project's needs; for example, the suborbital shuttle proposed by EADS Astrium would cost €1 billion, and the conversion of ESA's Automated Transfer Vehicle into a human-rated transport system would cost around €2 billion.

By 2021, the project had been cancelled permanently.

=== Barcelona Moon Team ===
Galactic Suite Design was the lead company in a consortium of companies fielding the Barcelona Moon Team in the Google Lunar X Prize competition. GSD does so through a filial company, Galactic Suite Moon Race. BMT is the official candidate to the GLXP. The team was a multidisciplinary joint venture. The team also includes the Centre of Aerospace Technology in Barcelona (CTAE), the Polytechnic University of Catalonia (UPC) or the international engineering advisory firm Altran. BMT wants to promote a widening involvement of private initiative in the development of space technology and industry, also including sectors such as exploration and tourism.

The Barcelona Moon Team GXLP mission was scheduled to launch aboard a Chinese Long March 2C in June 2015. However, the team later withdrew their entry from the competition.
