= Swiss Propulsion Laboratory =

Rocket laboratory in Langenthal, Switzerland

The Swiss Propulsion Laboratory (SPL) is a rocket laboratory that runs integrated programs focusing on research and development of space-technology and space tourism. It is located in Langenthal, Switzerland and was founded in 1998. The company develops, builds and runs rocket systems that transport small payloads into low Earth orbit (LEO).

The company works and coordinates with external facilities and other organizations such as universities, graduate schools and Switzerland's precision industry. It is a partner of the White Label Space team, which is currently competing in the Google Lunar X PRIZE.
