= BMT =

BMT or bmt may refer to:

== Medicine ==
- Bone marrow transplantation, hematopoietic stem cell transplantation

== Science and technology ==
- 5-hydroxyfuranocoumarin 5-O-methyltransferase, an enzyme
- Bangladesh Meteorological Department, the national meteorological organization of Bangladesh
- Barcelona Moon Team, a Spanish Google Lunar X-Prize competitor

== Transportation ==
- Brooklyn–Manhattan Transit Corporation, one of the three original New York City Subway systems
  - B Division (New York City Subway), further subdivided into the BMT Division (B1) and the IND Division (B2)
- IATA code and FAA location identifier for Beaumont Municipal Airport, Beaumont, Texas
- Station code for Beaumont (Amtrak station), Beaumont, Texas
- Station code for Bedminster railway station, Bristol, England
- Station code for Begumpet railway station, Hyderabad, Telangana, India
- Railway service timetable code for Blue Mountains Line, New South Wales, Australia

== Other ==
- Basic Military Training in some military forces
- Baby Monkey Torture, a form of Zoosadism videos produced by Monkey hate circles.
- Benton MacKaye Trail, a footpath in the Appalachian Mountains
- Biel Mean Time, a decimal time system by watchmaker Swatch
- Biggar Museum Trust, Biggar, Scotland
- Blessed Mother Teresa Catholic Secondary School, Scarborough, Ontario, Canada
- Blu Mar Ten, a musical group
- bmt, ISO 639-3 code for the Biao Mon language, а Mienic language of Guangxi province, China
- "BMT", a track from the 1998 album Sound Museum by Japanese electronic musician Towa Tei
- BMT (Birlashgan Millatlar Tashkiloti), the Uzbek acronym for the United Nations
- BMT, a global maritime consulting company headquartered in the United Kingdom
- Italian BMT, a sandwich from Subway
- Mechanical biological treatment, sometimes called biological mechanical treatment
- Peasant Workers' Bloc (in Romanian Blocul Muncitoresc-Ţărănesc or BMT), a Romanian political party which contested the 1928 and 1931 general elections
- "BMT!", a song by JPEGMAFIA on his album LP!

== See also ==
- Cobra BMT-2 APC, an Iranian armored personnel carrier
- MQR-13 BMTS (Ballistic Missile Target System), an unguided target rocket developed by the United States Army during the 1960s
