= Sergey Albertovich Smirnov =

Russian industrial designer (born 1974)

- Born: 1974
- Education: Stroganov Moscow State Academy of Arts and Industry
- Occupation: industrial designer

Sergey Albertovich Smirnov (Russian: Сергей Альбертович Смирнов; born in 1974) is a Russian industrial designer who founded Smirnov Design.

== Early life ==
While a student at the Moscow State Stroganov Academy of Industrial and Applied Arts, he designed and put into production an electric switch commissioned by MPO Electrotechnika. This switch became the company's flagship product.

== Career ==
In 2003, Sergey Smirnov founded Smirnov Technologies. It manufactures injection molds for plastic molding.

In 2006, Smirnov began working with the Ministry of Economic Development to devise a plan for the development of design in Russia.

In 2011, Sergey Smirnov became the Selenokhod lunar exploration project's chief designer as part of the Google Lunar X Prize competition. The project created a prototype of a remote-controlled rover equipped with a ski-walking mechanism and a bucket for collecting samples of lunar soil. In 2013, the Selenokhod project was closed absent funding.

In 2013, Smirnov became a member of the Engineering and Industrial Design Council under the Ministry of Industry and Trade.

In 2016, Smirnov headed the Scientific and Educational Center for Research and Innovations of the Moscow State Stroganov Academy of Industrial and Applied Arts. At the Open Innovations Forum 2017, Smirnov presented the RONAVI robotic warehouse logistics complex. The robotic loader is designed for large distribution centers and retail warehouses.

In 2018, Sergey Smirnov became Deputy Chairman of the Guild of Manufacturers, Suppliers, and Design Industry Specialists of the Moscow Chamber of Commerce and Industry.

In 2019 he was awarded the "Andrey Nartov" medal.
