= Peregrine Mission One =

Lunar lander built by Astrobotic Technology

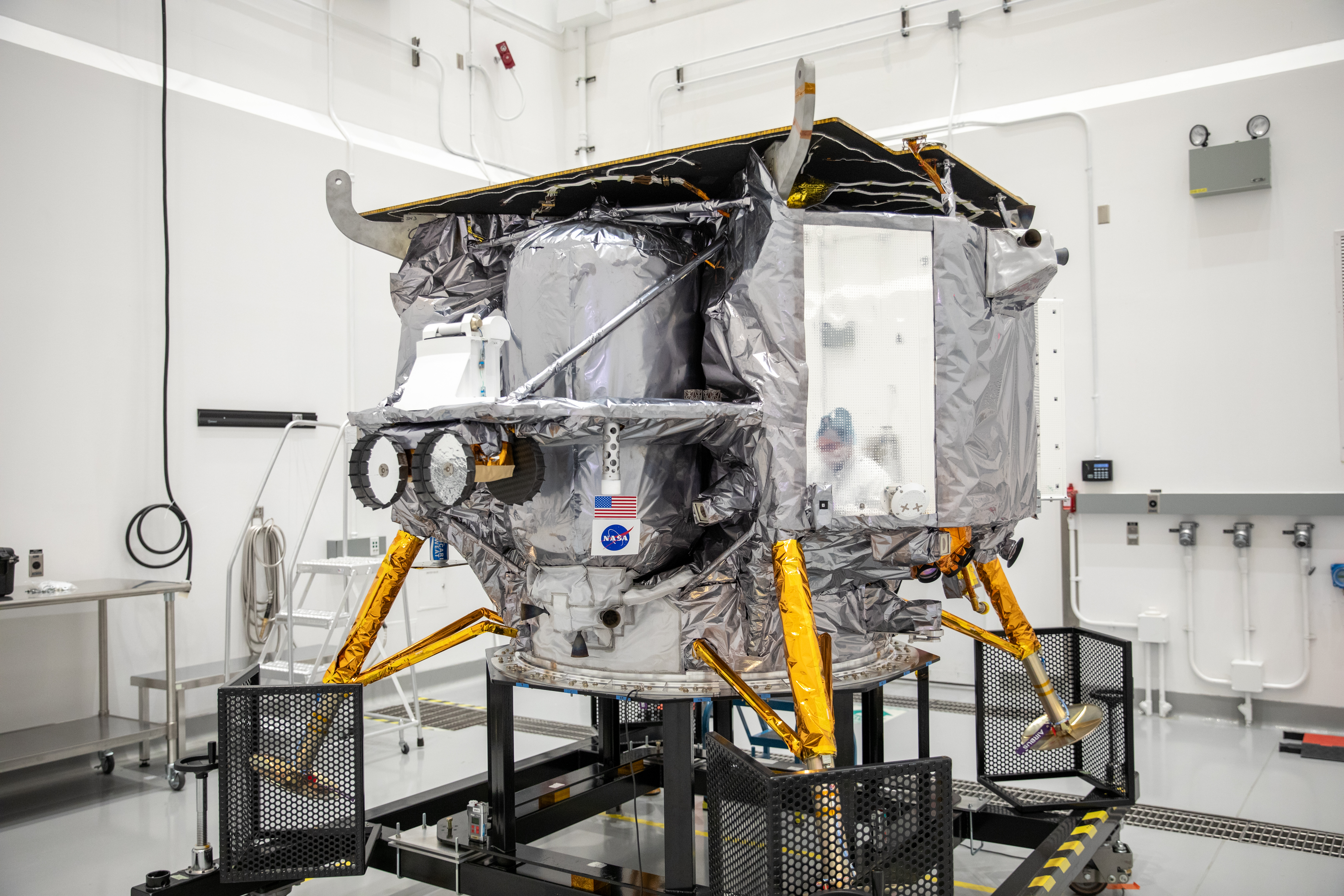
- Peregrine ahead of launch
- Mission type: Lunar landing
- Operator: Astrobotic Technology
- COSPAR ID: 2024-006A
- SATCAT no.: 58751
- Mission duration: 10 days (final); One lunar day (14 Earth days) on the Moon surface (planned)

Spacecraft properties
- Spacecraft: Peregrine
- Launch mass: 1,283 kg (2,829 lb)

Start of mission
- Launch date: January 8, 2024, 07:18:38 UTC
- Rocket: Vulcan Centaur VC2S
- Launch site: Cape Canaveral, SLC-41

End of mission
- Decay date: January 18, 2024, 21:04 UTC

Moon lander
- Landing date: February 23, 2024 (precluded)
- Landing site: Sinus Viscositatis (Bay of Stickiness, precluded)
- Mission insignia Astrobotic Technology Commercial Lunar Payload Services

Peregrine Lunar Lander flight 01, commonly referred to as Peregrine Mission One, was a failed American lunar lander mission. The lander, dubbed Peregrine, was built by Astrobotic Technology and carried payloads for the NASA Commercial Lunar Payload Services (CLPS) program. Peregrine Mission One launched on January 8, 2024, at 2:18 am EST, on the maiden flight of the Vulcan Centaur (Vulcan) rocket. The goal was to land the first U.S.-built lunar lander on the Moon since the crewed Apollo Lunar Module on Apollo 17 in 1972.

The lander carried multiple payloads, with a payload capacity of 90 kg. Shortly after the lander separated from the Vulcan rocket in lunar injection orbit, a propellant leak developed that prevented the lander from completing its mission. After six days in orbit, the spacecraft was redirected into Earth's atmosphere, where it burned up in Earth's atmosphere over the South Pacific Ocean on January 18, 2024.

== History ==
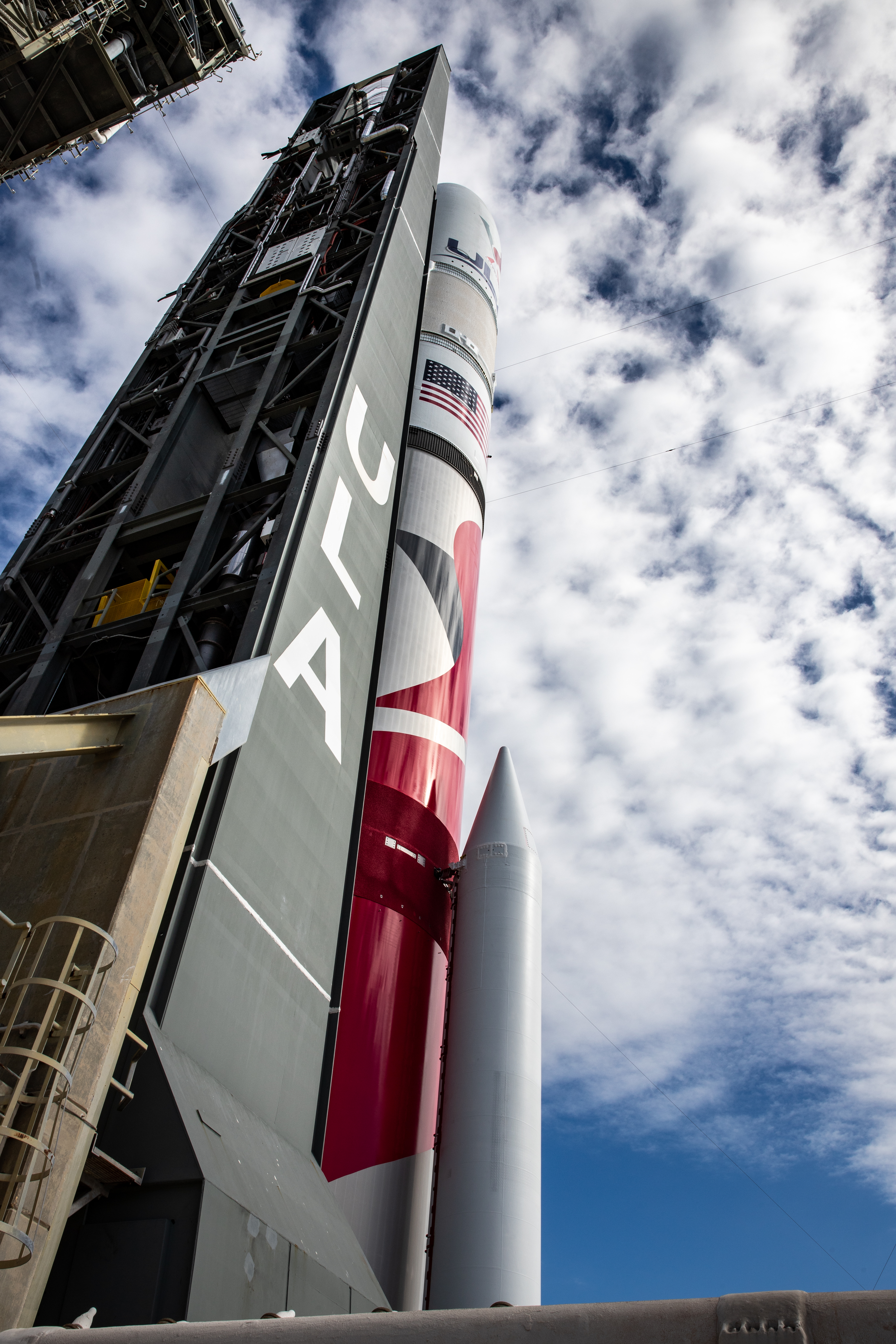
Peregrine being rolled out to Space Launch Complex 41 atop a Vulcan Centaur on January 5, 2024

In July 2017, Astrobotic announced an agreement with United Launch Alliance (ULA) to launch their Peregrine lander aboard a Vulcan launch vehicle. This first lunar lander mission, called Mission One, was initially to be launched in July 2021.

On November 29, 2018, Astrobotic was made eligible to bid on NASAs Commercial Lunar Payload Services (CLPS) to deliver science and technology payloads to the Moon.

In May 2019, Mission One received its first lander contract from NASA for 14 payloads. It also had 14 commercial payloads, including small rovers from Hakuto, Team AngelicvM, and a larger rover from Carnegie Mellon University, named Andy, which has a mass of 33 kg (73 lb) and is 103 cm (41 in) tall. Another small rover, Spacebit, weighing 1.5 kg (3.3 lb), was designed to travel at least 10 m (33 ft) on four legs. Other payloads include a library, in microprint on nickel, with Wikipedia contents and Long Now Foundation's Rosetta Project. Space burial companies Elysium Space and Celestis paid Astrobotic to carry human remains. The decision to include human remains was criticized by the Navajo Nation, whose president, Buu Nygren, argued that the Moon is sacred to the Navajo and other American Indian nations.

In June 2021, ULA CEO Tory Bruno announced that payload and engine-testing problems would delay the maiden flight of Vulcan, with Mission One aboard, to 2022. On February 23, 2023, ULA announced an expected launch date for the mission of May 4, 2023. After an anomaly during testing of the Vulcan Centaur on March 29, the launch was delayed until June or July, and then until late 2023.

In early December 2023, Bruno said problems found during a wet dress rehearsal of the rocket would likely delay the launch until the next launch window, on January 8.

Peregrine carries a maximum payload mass of 90 kg (200 lb) during Mission One, and it was planned to land on Gruithuisen Gamma.

The payload mass for the planned second mission (Mission Two) is capped at 175 kg (386 lb), and the Mission Three and later missions would carry the full payload capacity of 265 kg (584 lb).

== Lander ==
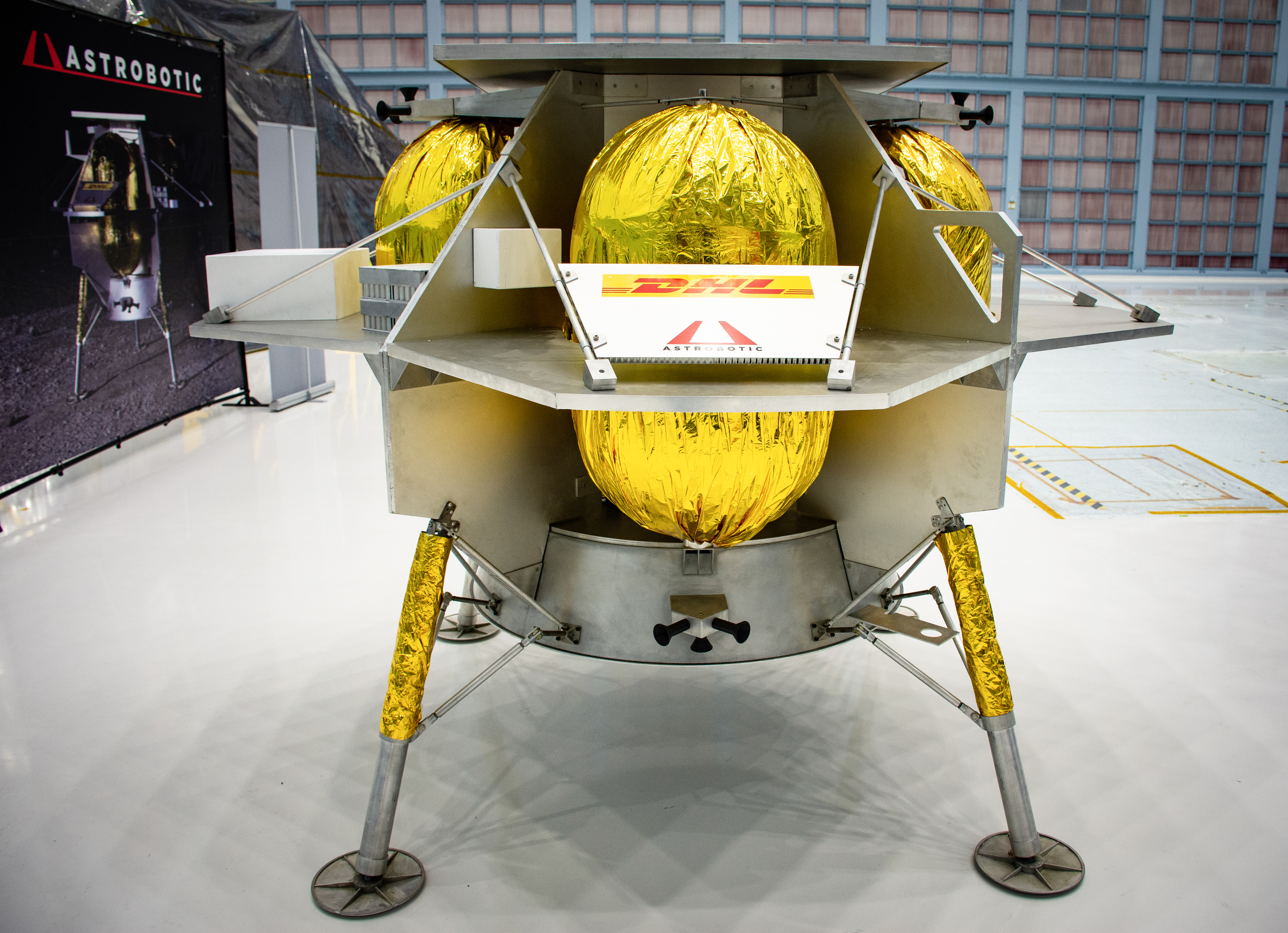
Astrobotic Peregrine lander

In 2016, Astrobotic announced plans to build the Peregrine lander, based on their previous concept lander, Griffin, which was larger but with the same payload capacity. Astrobotic hired Airbus Defence and Space to help refine the lander's design.

The Peregrine bus is largely of aluminum alloy, and it is reconfigurable for specific missions. Its propulsion system has five thrusters built by Frontier Aerospace, each producing 150 lb (667 N) thrust. This propulsion system was designed to handle the trans-lunar injection, trajectory corrections, lunar orbit insertion, and powered descent. The propulsion system can deliver an orbiter to the Moon and perform a powered soft landing. The lander can carry up to 450 kg (990 lb) of bi-propellant mass in four tanks; its composition is MON-25/MMH, a hypergolic bi-propellant. For attitude control (orientation), the spacecraft uses 12 thrusters (45 N each) also powered by MON-25/MMH.

The spacecraft's avionics incorporate guidance and navigation to the Moon, and a Doppler LiDAR to assist the automated landing on four legs. From Mission 2, its landing ellipse will be 100 m × 100 m, down from 24 km × 6 km previously.

Peregrine is about 2.5 m wide and 1.9 m tall, and would have been able to deliver up to 265 kg (584 lb) of payload to the surface of the Moon.

Its electrical systems are powered by a lithium-ion battery that is recharged by a solar panel made of GaInP/GaAs/Ge. Radiators and thermal insulators are used to dispose of excess heat, but the lander does not carry heaters, so the first few Peregrine landers are not expected to survive the lunar night, which lasts 14 Earth days. Future missions could be adapted to do so.

For communications to Earth, the lander uses frequencies within the X-band range for uplink as well as downlink. After landing, a 2.4 GHz Wi-Fi modem is to enable wireless communication between the lander and deployed rovers on the lunar surface.

=== Payloads ===
==== Lunar rovers ====
Country	Name	Agency or company	Summary
Mexico	Colmena × 5	Agencia Espacial Mexicana	Agencia Espacial Mexicana (AEM), the Mexican Space Agency, attempted to fly the first Latin American scientific instruments to the surface of the Moon. The payload consisted of five small robots, weighing less than 60 grams and measuring 12 centimeters in diameter, which were to be catapulted onto the lunar surface.
United States	Iris	Carnegie Mellon University	Carnegie Mellon University's Iris was a 2 kg rover designed by university students. Its shoebox-sized chassis and bottle-cap wheels were made from carbon fiber, a first for planetary robotics. Iris was designed to test small, lightweight rover mobility on the Moon, collect images for geological sciences, and gather UWB RF ranging data for testing new relative localization techniques.

Instruments

Country	Name	Agency or company	Summary
United States	Laser Retroreflector Array (LRA)	NASA	A retroreflector is a device that bounces any light that shines on it directly backwards (180° from the incoming light) from it. The LRA was a collection of eight of these, each a 1.25-cm diameter glass corner cube prism, all embedded in an aluminum hemisphere (painted gold) and mounted to the lander deck. It was designed to efficiently retroreflect laser signals from other orbiting and landing spacecraft over a wide range of incoming directions, thereby enabling precise measurement of the distance between the orbiting or landing spacecraft to the lander. The LRA was to function as a location marker on the Moon for decades. (Note: this LRA design was too small for laser ranging from the Earth).
United States	Linear Energy Transfer Spectrometer (LETS)	NASA	Space radiation can harm astronauts on exploration missions outside the Earth's protective atmosphere, and more so on the Moon than in Low Earth Orbit (LEO). The first source of risk is the total radiation dose from Galactic Cosmic Rays, which is about twice as high on the lunar surface as in LEO. The second source of risk is from space weather events resulting from solar activity. The Linear Energy Transfer Spectrometer (LETS) was a radiation monitor that was derived from heritage hardware flown on Orion EFT-1 and was slated to fly on the Orion EM-1 mission that would have enabled acquisition of knowledge of the lunar radiation environment and demonstrate the capabilities of the system on the lunar surface. This sensor was to measure the rate of incident radiation providing information that would be critical to understanding and mitigating the hazardous environment that people would experience as they explore the surface of the Moon.
Germany	M-42 Radiation Detector	DLR	This radiation detector was a complement to another scientific experiment riding aboard NASA's Artemis I mission. These sensors were to precisely measure the level of radiation a human body will encounter on a trip to the Moon and back. The data from both Artemis I and Peregrine Missions will improve our understanding of lunar spaceflight environmental conditions with respect to astronaut health, as space radiation will be one of the key risks in the future of Human Space Exploration.
United States	Navigation Doppler Lidar (NDL)	NASA	NDL was a LIDAR-based (Light Detection and Ranging) descent and landing sensor. This instrument (LIDAR) operates on the same principles of radar but uses pulses of light from a laser instead of radio waves. NDL was to measure vehicle velocity (speed and direction) and altitude (distance to ground) with high precision during descent to touchdown.
United States	Near-Infrared Volatile Spectrometer System (NIRVSS)	NASA	The payload included a spectrometer context imager and a longwave calibration sensor. It was to measure surface and subsurface hydration (H_{2}O and OH) and CO_{2} and methane (CH_{4}) while simultaneously mapping surface morphology and surface temperature. The plan was for the measurements to take place during rover traverse when integrated onto a rover, throughout areas of targeted volatile investigation (called science stations), and during drilling activities. This instrument was created at NASA Ames Research Center. In total, it had three specific instruments: the near-infrared spectrometer, Ames imaging module, and longwave calibration sensor.
United States	Neutron Spectrometer System (NSS)	NASA	The NSS instrument was to determine the abundance of hydrogen-bearing materials and the bulk regolith composition at the landing site and measure any time variations in hydrogenous volatile abundance during the diurnal cycle. NSS could measure the total volume of hydrogen up to three feet below the surface, providing high-resolution ground truth data for measurements made from instruments in orbit around the Moon. NSS was to measure the number and energy of neutrons present in the lunar surface environment, which can be used to infer the amount of hydrogen present in the environment. This detection is possible because when neutrons strike a hydrogen atom, they lose a lot of energy.
United States	Peregrine Ion-Trap Mass Spectrometer (PITMS)	NASA	PITMS was to characterize the lunar exosphere after descent and landing, and throughout the lunar day, to understand the release and movement of volatile species. Previous missions have demonstrated the presence of volatiles at the lunar surface, but significant questions remain about where those volatiles came from and how they are transported across the lunar surface. Investigating how the lunar exosphere changes over the course of a lunar day can provide insight into the transport process for volatiles on the Moon. The instrument had the ability to measure the low level of gases expected in the lunar exosphere and released by regolith interaction with surface disturbances, like rovers. The PITMS sensor had direct heritage from the Ptolemy mass spectrometer that made the first in situ measurements of volatiles and organics on comet 67P with the Rosetta lander, Philae. PITMS was to operate in a passive sampling mode, where molecules fall into the zenith-facing aperture and are trapped by a radiofrequency field, then sequentially released for analysis. PITMS had a unit mass resolution up to an upper mass-to-charge (m/z) limit of 150 Da. The PITMS investigation was to provide time-resolved variability of OH, H_{2}O, noble gases, nitrogen, and sodium compounds released from the soil and present in the exosphere over the course of a lunar day. PITMS observations were to complement other instruments on board the Peregrine lander for a comprehensive approach to understanding the surface and exosphere composition, linking surface properties and composition to LADEE measurements from orbit, and providing a mid-latitude point of comparison for polar measurements planned by VIPER, PROSPECT, and other missions. The PITMS data was to provide a critical mid-latitude link to future polar mass specs to characterize the latitudinal migration of volatiles from equator to poles. PITMS was a joint NASA-ESA project implemented by NASA's Goddard Space Flight Center (GSFC) and ESA's contractors Open University (OU) and STFC RAL Space, with coordination and support provided by ESA's Space Research and Technology Centre (ESTEC). The integrated PITMS payload and science investigation were to be operated by GSFC with an international team of scientists.
United States	Terrain Relative Navigation (TRN)	Astrobotic	Astrobotic was to demonstrate its standalone Terrain Relative Navigation (TRN) sensor as a payload on its first mission to the Moon. TRN was to enable spacecraft to perform landings on planetary surfaces with an unparalleled accuracy of less than 100 meters. The TRN sensor was being developed under a $10 million NASA Tipping Point contract with NASA Johnson Space Center, Jet Propulsion Laboratory, and Moog.

==== Time capsules ====
Country	Name	Agency or company	Type
United States	Bitcoin Magazine Genesis Plate	BIT Inc.	Plaque
Germany	DHL MoonBox	DHL	Commercial payload capsules
Canada	Lunar Codex	Incandence	Artwork, books, stories, music
United Kingdom	Footsteps on the Moon	Lunar Mission One	Image bank
United States	Luna 02	Celestis	Memorial capsule
Seychelles	Lunar Bitcoin	BitMEX	Cryptocurrency
Japan	Lunar Dream Capsule	Astroscale	Time capsule
United States	Memorial Space Flight Services	Elysium Space	Memorial capsule
Hungary	Memory of Mankind on the Moon	Puli Space Technologies	Time capsule
United States	MoonArk	Carnegie Mellon University	Lunar Museum
United States	The Arch Libraries	Arch Mission Foundation	Time capsule
Canada United States	Writers on the Moon	Writers on the Moon	Stories by 133 authors

== Mission ==
=== Launch and trajectory ===
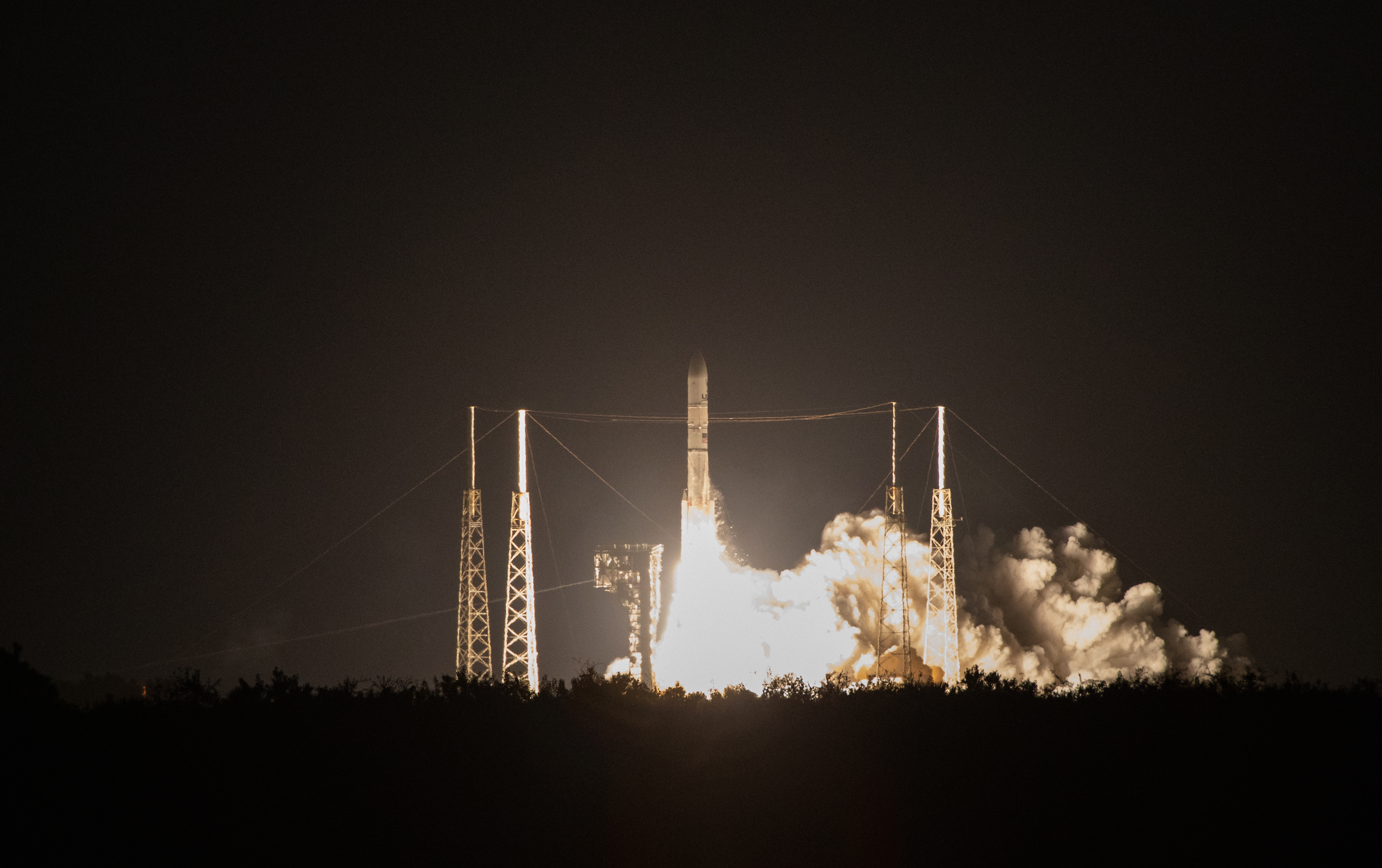
Launch of the Peregrine lunar lander on Vulcan's first flight

On January 8, 2024, ULA used the inaugural flight of the Vulcan Centaur rocket to launch the Peregrine mission. Lift-off from Cape Canaveral Space Launch Complex 41 took place at 2:18 am EST. The rocket was launched in the VC2S configuration, with two solid rocket boosters and a standard-length fairing. The solid rocket boosters separated from the vehicle at T+1 minute 50 seconds. The first stage continued firing its BE-4 engines until T+4:59 and separated a few seconds later. The Centaur upper stage started its first burn at T+5:15, which took more than 10 minutes to complete and put the vehicle into a low Earth orbit. Following a coast phase, the Centaur fired for the second time at T+43:35 to start the trans-lunar injection burn, which lasted about three minutes. The Peregrine lander separated from the rocket at T+50:26.

Peregrine was to take a 46-day trajectory to the Moon, performing burns to enter lunar orbit and slowly approach the lunar surface. Landing was planned for February 23, 2024.

Animation of Peregrine – Original plan

Around the Earth

Around the Moon

Peregrine · Moon · Earth

=== Propellant leak ===
Roughly seven hours after the launch, Astrobotic reported that a problem, likely with the propulsion system, had "prevented [the lander] from achieving a stable sun-pointing orientation". The company conducted an unplanned maneuver of the spacecraft to turn the solar panels toward the Sun, and, after an expected communications blackout, confirmed that the spacecraft was once again generating sufficient power. However, the problem was identified as a gradual propellant leak that required constant consumption of fuel to counteract. At 21:16 EST, Astrobotic said in a statement that thrusters were operating "well beyond their expected service life cycles" and that the "spacecraft could continue in a stable sun-pointing state for approximately 40 more hours" before it would run out of fuel, then lose attitude control and power.

Later, the company confirmed that Peregrine could no longer land on the Moon, although it could continue to operate as a spacecraft. Photographs taken by the spacecraft showed damage to external insulation, perhaps caused by a valve that failed to fully close, causing the oxidizer tank to rupture.

Four days into the mission, the propellant leak appeared to slow, and Astrobotic reported that "there is growing optimism that Peregrine could survive much longer" than was previously anticipated.

=== Reentry ===
The spacecraft eventually reached a position that would have allowed it to reach the Moon with trajectory corrections. Six days into the mission, Astrobotic decided to direct the spacecraft to burn up in Earth's atmosphere to avoid space debris.

A controlled re-entry took place at 15:59 on January 18 EST (20:59 UTC), with possible impact somewhere near Point Nemo, a spacecraft cemetery in the South Pacific. The last contact with the spacecraft was achieved by DSS-36, an antenna of the NASA Deep Space Network (DSN) at the Canberra Deep Space Communication Complex in Australia.

== Future ==
Peregrine was the first of NASA's CLPS missions, with the second, Intuitive Machines' Odysseus, which launched and landed on the Moon in February 2024. Astrobotic will have a second landing attempt, consisting of the larger Griffin lander, with launch scheduled for July 2026. As of August 2025, the Griffin lander is expected to land with Astrolabs FLIP rover.
