= CTAE =

CTAE may refer to:

- Commonwealth Trans-Antarctic Expedition
- College of Technology & Engineering, Udaipur in Udaipur
- Community Technical and Adult Education, a vocational-technical student organization
- Centre de Technologia Aerospacial, an Aerospace Research and Technology Centre based in Barcelona, Spain.
