= Memory of Mankind on the Moon =

Time capsule onboard Peregrine lander

Memory of Mankind on the Moon was a time capsule that was launched onboard Astrobotic Technology's Peregrine lander. It was made in collaboration with Hungarian company Puli Space Technologies and Memory of Mankind.
