= Interorbital =

Interorbital may refer to:

- Interorbital scales (in snakes)
- Interorbital region of the skull
- Interorbital Systems
