= S-adenosyl-L-methionine:bergaptol O-methyltransferase =

S-adenosyl-L-methionine:bergaptol O-methyltransferase may refer to:

- 5-hydroxyfuranocoumarin 5-O-methyltransferase
- Bergaptol O-methyltransferase
