= Team FREDNET =

Competitor in the Google Lunar X PRIZE competition

Team FREDNET tf(x) Logo.

Team FREDNET is an international Open Source and Open Participation competitor in the Google Lunar X PRIZE competition. Uniquely, the team also allows organizations and individuals to participate freely in its mission through the team's website. Their strategy is to utilize the same approach for developing open source software in order to build a lunar lander and a lunar rovers capable of winning the Google Lunar X Prize. Team FREDNET plans to establish an Open Space Foundation that provides incentives, education, and funding to future individuals and organizations seeking to develop their own space projects. In addition, they hope to foster greater public interest and education in Space Exploration and Research.

== Organization Overview ==
=== Key People ===
Team FREDNET is led by Fred J. Bourgeois, III. Dr. Sean Casey of the Universities Space Research Association manages business development for Team FREDNET. Mike Barrucco is the principal guidance, navigation, and control engineer for the team. Richard Core is Team FREDNET's project manager.

=== Key Affiliations ===
Team FREDNET has affiliations with a number of clubs, schools, and businesses.

- Stuyvesant Robot Club
- Elphel
- Team Cheese of the Fall 2009 MECH 460 course from Queen's University in Kingston Ontario, Canada - Working on designing systems to be used for the Lunar Lander System.

As of 2009, the team had two sponsors.

- Applios Inc—Applied Open Source Technologies
- Robot Club of Traverse City

=== Open Source Development Team ===
The team's charter is "Make Cool Stuff." This objective applies towards "stuff" that can be used in Space and towards building tools that will make it easier to build design the space "stuff". Essentially, the goal is to build a catalog of Space Components in order to make Space Commercialization more open, cost-effective, productive, and accessible.

==== Open Source Development Team ====
Organizing this far-flung group posed a challenge. Open source software teams can normally download a program and add their own contributions, but Team FREDNET had to translate its many individual ideas into rocket engines and rover gears.

To address this challenge, Team FREDNET took major steps in August and September 2009 to make it easier for globally distributed collaboration to occur by providing guidelines for people who wanted to make contributions.

==== Open Source Development Software Tools ====
Team FREDNET relies heavily on Open Source Software Tools to accomplish their mission.

- The team uses MediaWiki software from the Wikimedia Foundation for organizing its development efforts.
- Launchpad is used for certain bug tracking and configuration management utilities.
- Blender is the animation software the team uses for showing a simulation of the mission.

== Missions and Objectives ==
Team FREDNET tf(x) Lunar Rover Rendering.

=== Mission Architecture ===
Team FREDNET plans to use a simple architecture in their bid to win the Google Lunar X PRIZE, consisting of a small lander that will deploy a small lunar rover which in turn will use the lander as a communication relay back to Earth.

There are three main components to the Team FREDNET mission which include (a) the transfer mission (i.e. getting the rover from the Earth to the Moon), (b) the Moon mission (i.e. directing the rover to accomplish the tasks needed to win the Google Lunar X-Prize), and (c) the Earth mission (i.e. receiving the data that the rover must transmit to Earth to win the Google Lunar X PRIZE).

==== The Transfer Mission ====
- The Launcher cost is proportional to mass. An applicable approximation is 31,000 $/kg. The launcher will put this mass to LEO orbit (8600 m/s of Delta_V for about 200 km LEO) with a solid propellant stage having a 260-second specific impulse.
- The Lunar Bus will do a number of maneuvers (elliptic transfer orbits) in order to gain 4400 m/s of Delta_V for the transfer orbit to the Moon. The Lunar Bus will use bi-propellant with a specific impulse of 320 s. Note that in some contexts we regard the Launcher and Bus as one component, the vehicle system transporting the Lander and Rover.

==== The Moon Mission ====
- The Lunar Lander is being designed to do a descent maneuver in order to gain 2200 m/s of Delta_V to transfer orbit to the Moon. The Lunar Bus will use a bi-propellant with a specific impulse of 320 s.
- The Lunar Rover plan is to travel 500 meters from the Lunar Lander then send prize-specified Mooncast, videos, pictures, emails, etc.

==== The Earth Mission ====
- A Ground Support System is planned to be able to receive the weak signal from the Moon in order to receive the rover Mooncast.

=== Education Programs ===
The team wants to offer educational institutions an opportunity to add science projects fitting inside the parameters of the mission to promote awareness of commercial space travel and space exploration.

As part of this education effort, the team has contributed towards a team that created a LEGO Mindstorms based rover that is controlled by Bluetooth technology. A future elementary school level competition will be used to name the Rover that the team will eventually send to the moon.
