= Synergy Moon =

International lunar exploration enterprise

Team Synergy Moon
- Company type: Google Lunar X Prize entrant
- Industry: Lunar exploration
- Founded: 2010
- Headquarters: International
- Key people: Kevin Myrick / Nebojša Stanojević/ Jayakumar Venkatesan
- Website: www.synergymoon.com

Synergy Moon is an international commercial enterprise dedicated to the development of space technologies and related services.

It was originally formed in 2010 as a team competing for the Google Lunar X Prize —a challenge to land the first privately funded rover on the Moon. It was one of five finalist teams, out of an original 33 entrants.

== History ==
Team Synergy Moon was formed in 2010 when Kevin Myrick, founder and CEO of InterPlanetary Ventures, and Nebojša Stanojević, founder of The Human Synergy Moon Project, decided to merge their ventures and partner with Interorbital Systems to create a single entrant for the Google Lunar X Prize, and filed proof of its launch agreement on August 30, 2016.

Jayakumar Venkatesan took the responsibility as Chief Technology Officer to design and develop the spacecraft systems according to the competition guidelines.

Competition guidelines required the rover to travel 500 metres and transmit images, video, data, an sms and an email back to Earth. With working groups on in over 15 countries and on 6 continents, Team Synergy Moon promotes international cooperation in space exploration and development.

In December 2016 Google Lunar X Prize entrants Team Stellar (Croatia / Australia), Team Omega Envoy (USA), Team Space META (Brasil) and Team Independence-X (Malaysia) partnered with Team Synergy Moon to become Synergy Space Explorers.

The team planned to use an Interorbital Systems Neptune N-8 LUNA launch vehicle to deploy its Tesla Surveyor rover on the surface of the Moon during the second half of 2017. The launch was planned from an open-ocean location off the California coast but it did not happen.

Teams had until 31 March 2018 to launch their missions..

On 23 January 2018, the X Prize Foundation announced that "no team would be able to make a launch attempt to reach the Moon by the [31 March 2018] deadline... and the US$30 million Google Lunar XPRIZE will go unclaimed.". Synergy Moon reported in February 2018 that they are negotiating with TeamIndus to possibly launch their landers together, aiming for a launch in 2019.
