= Penn State Lunar Lion Team =

Spacecraft engineering team at Penn State

Lunar Lion
- Company type: private
- Industry: university
- Founded: 2013
- Headquarters: University Park, Pennsylvania, United States
- Key people: Michael Paul
- Website: lunarlion.psu.edu

Lunar Lion is a team of Penn State students and engineers from the Penn State Applied Research Laboratory. The team hopes to develop and land their spacecraft, the Lunar Lion on the Moon. The team is student run under the direction of Dr. Alexander Rattner, a mechanical engineering professor at Penn State's Multiscale Thermal Fluids and Energy.

The team, which is privately funded, secured its first $2.5 million, most of which was internal funding, to get the project started.

The team was formerly a competitor in the Google Lunar X Prize competition, but has since withdrawn.

== Spacecraft ==
The Lunar Lion is the spacecraft currently being developed to reach the Moon. The craft is planned to be sent on a commercial launch vehicle which will send it into space and place it on a trajectory to the Moon. It is then expected to make a controlled descent to the lunar surface where it will transmit high-resolution photographic images and video to the mission operations center at Penn State. The craft will then take off and fly a short distance to a second landing site while streaming the event live.

== Testing and Development ==
=== Phase 0 ===
At the end of October 2013, the team successfully finished Phase 0, a series of tests that validated the rocket-testing procedure. The phase included the development of contingency plans, safety plans, and thorough rocket testing procedure. As part of this phase, full rocket firing was simulated and investigated. Test plans must meet the Environmental Health and Safety Standards.

=== Phase 1 ===
Phase 1 included testing of combustible liquid fuel, a NASA-provided pencil thruster, and custom thrusters developed at Penn State.

=== Phase 2 ===
The initial liquid bipropellant part of this phase was completed towards the end of summer 2014. The team characterized and tested hydrogen peroxide monopropellant thrusters. These were used on the first flight vehicle the team constructed, a prototype called Puma. Each of the four 100 lbf engines were characterized to generate a thrust profile which was used for Puma's flight testing. Puma was developed for constrained vertical flight, with guide cables restricting motion to a single axis. Static testing of Puma began during the summer of 2016, and a constrained flight test was conducted on October 22, 2016. Puma made its first flight to an altitude of 3.5 feet, soft landing under its own power.

== See also ==
- Private spaceflight
