= SpaceMETA =

Brazilian aerospace engineering team

SpaceMETA is a Brazilian group founded in 2010 to explore aerospace opportunities motivated by Google Lunar X Prize competition.

As of 2012, SpaceMETA was one of the less than 30 active teams selected to participate in a competition that offers US$30 million to the team that first lands on the lunar surface and achieves several milestones (landing a robot on the surface of the Moon, traveling 500 meters over the lunar surface, and sending images and data back to the Earth). In its first mission, SpaceMETA decided to participate in bringing rupture ideas to the race, considering using at a minimum level conventional and already-used space technologies and solutions. SpaceMETA was the last team to be selected by the X Prize Foundation to participate in the GLXP, and the only one selected from Brazil.

== History ==
SpaceMETA was initially sponsored by Intel Corporation, which has the first right refusal for a first round of investment on a success case basis.

== Founders ==
SpaceMETA was founded by Sergio Cabral Cavalcanti, a researcher from Federal University of Rio de Janeiro.

== Teams ==
First Team ( 2010 ) SpaceMETA first Team was formed by

- Sergio Cabra; Cavalcanti ( founder )
- Juliana Laxe
- Nelson Marques
- Laurent Gil
- Several professors from UFRJ (Federal University of Rio de Janeiro) and UERJ (State University of Rio de Janeiro)

After 10 years of Project development, several world roadshows with Google GLXP, and fundraising, SpaceMETA began building its second team. It changed its initial goal to a low orbit goal to deploy an ionic-powered engine for a power test before starting a moon movement.

Second Team (2020)

- Sergio Cabral Cavalcanti (founder)
- Juliana Laxe
- Davi Clemente Monteiro Correia
- Scientist Charles Duvoisin Instituto IBCI

== Joint Venture with Synergy Moon ==
SpaceMETA and several other teams have joined Synergy Moon as one of the five finalist teams to land on the Moon using a possible Orbital Rocket as a primary payload or an Indian rocket as a second payload.

As a premise to not use a commodity project Falcon 9 from SpaceX, the founder of SpaceMETA, Sergio Cabral Cavalcanti, has declared that the team was more interested in an independent innovation once Falcon 9 has Merlin Engine – no news different from Saturn V from Rockectdine engines, despite its fantastic technology project.

== Mission overview ==
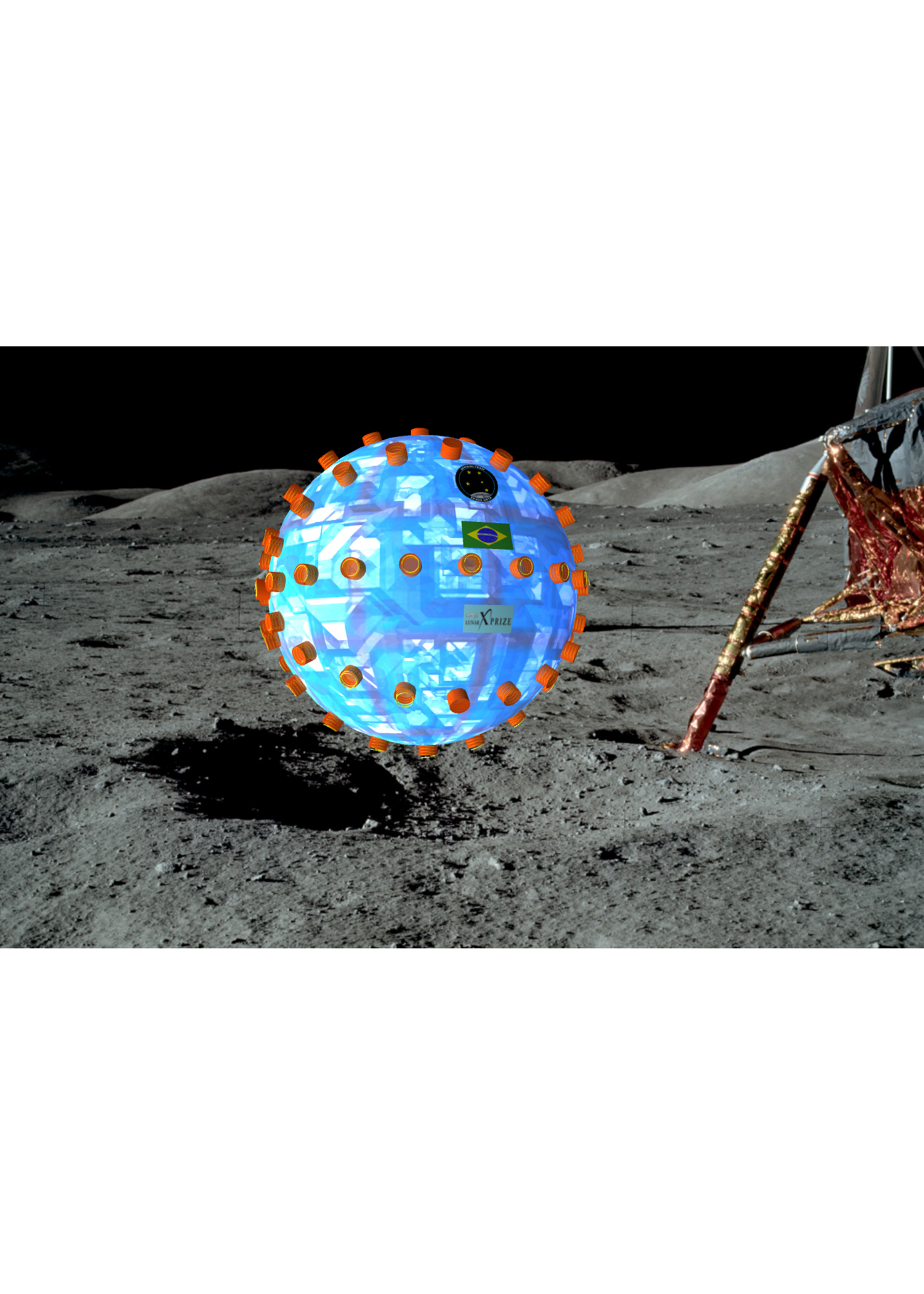
SpaceMETA Solitaire near Apollo 12

SpaceMETA Mission Overview Summary, as presented to the X Prize Committee, has proposed several rupture innovation approach for its mission. The disclosed innovations are related to the following technical approaches:

1. Usage of ethanol as rocket fuel
2. Launch the vehicle not from the ground but a lifted launch using balloons / auxiliary craft
3. Usage of inflatable structures instead, to transport big things that should be armed there (like antennas and solar panels)
4. Infinity Motion – SpaceMETA doesn't use a conventional energy system to create movement on the moon rover (called Solitaire (x-Frog and x-Blob)), but a NITINOL and Coil based kinetic energy converter called Infinity Motion.
5. Send information to the Earth not using electromagnetic waves, but a special Optical Modulation reflecting the solar light
6. During the movement of the Lunar Modules on the Surface, usage of the contact/impact process, so embedded sensors will capture the echoes above the surface
7. Geographically, SpaceMETA plans to visit some SETI / Scientific related sites of interest on the Moon

== Gallery ==
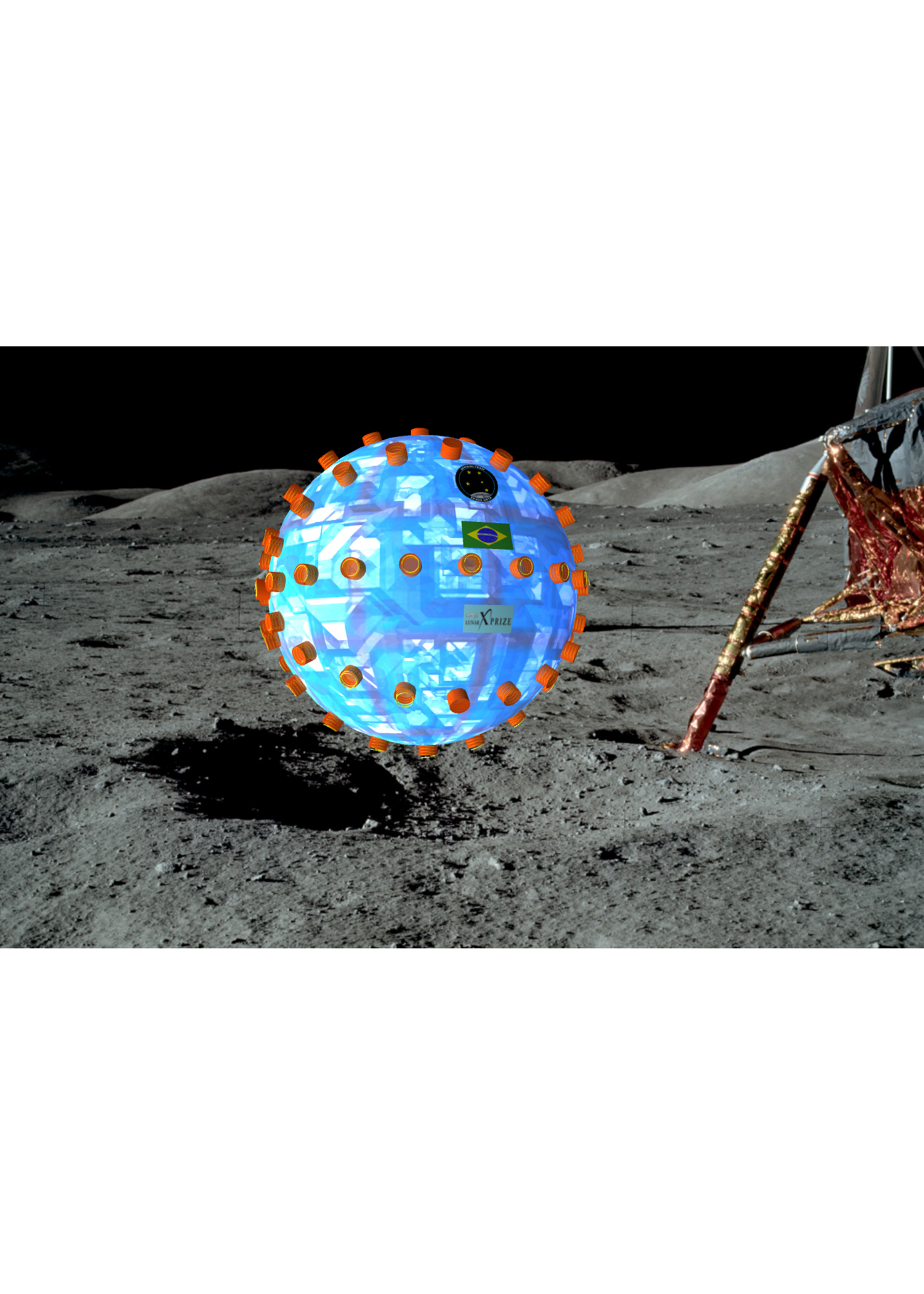
SpaceMETA Solitaire near Apollo 12

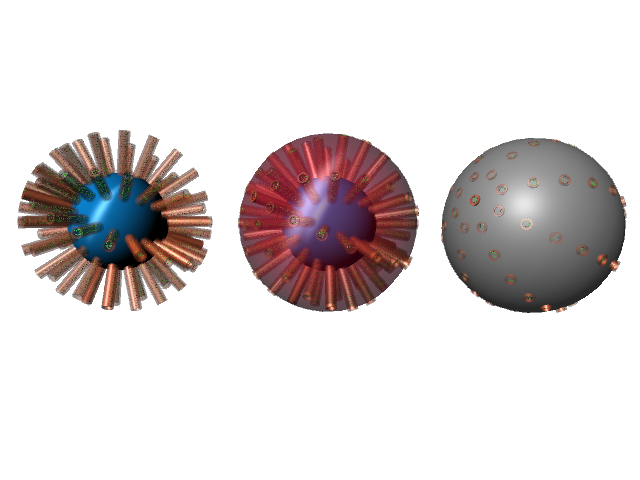
SpaceMETA Lunar Rover

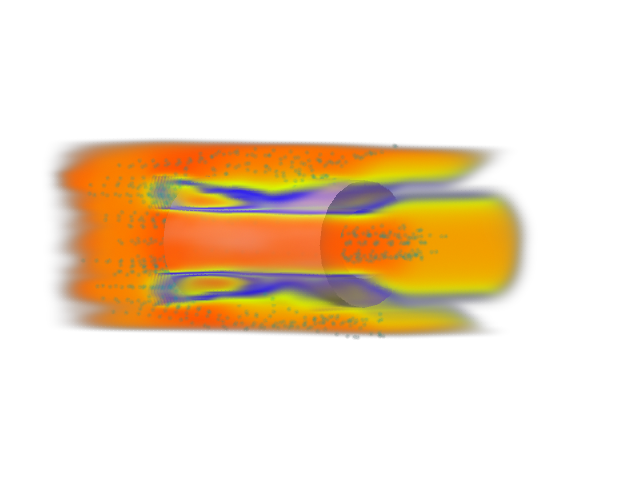
SpaceMETA Windtunnel simulation

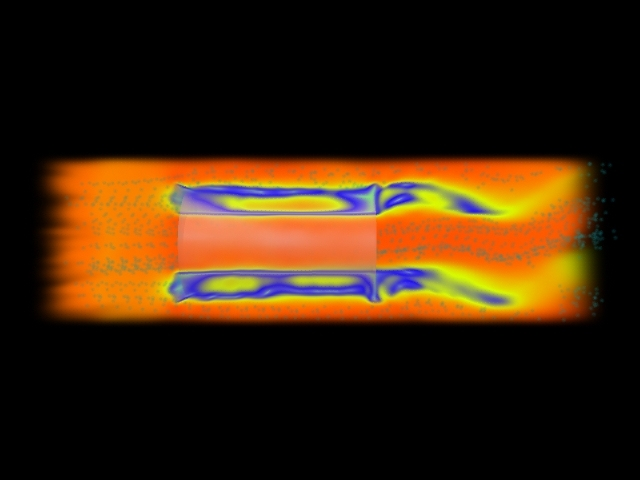
SpaceMETA windtunnel simulation

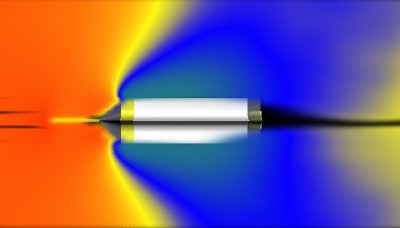
SpaceMETA supersonic pressure simulation

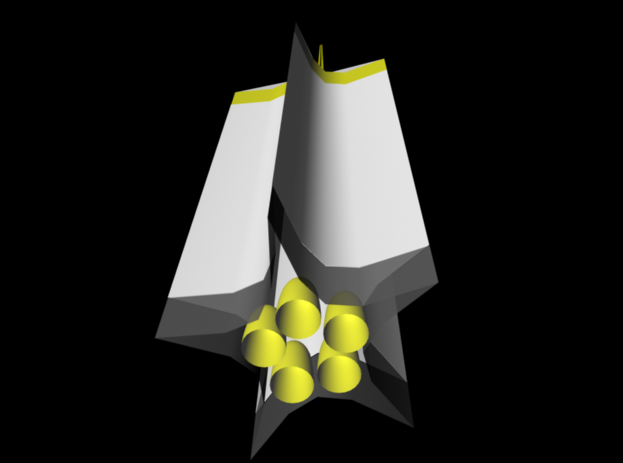
SpaceMETA rupture rocket design

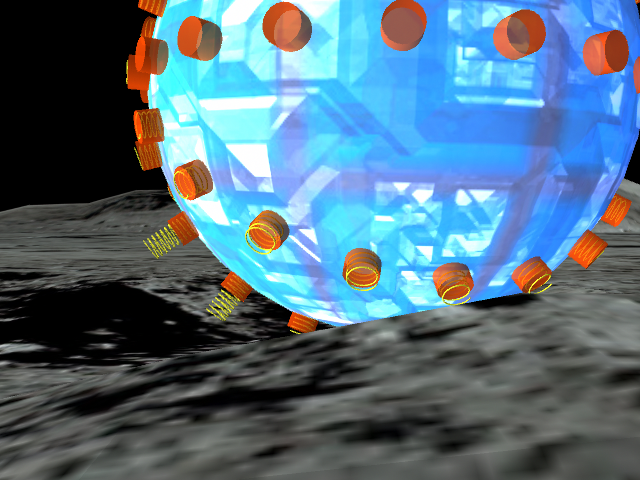
SpaceMETA Solitaire Lunar Rover with NITINOL Legs Coil

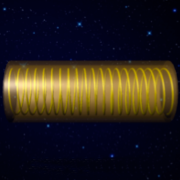
