= Team AngelicvM =

Private company

- Company type: Private
- Industry: Aerospace
- Headquarters: Santiago, Chile
- Key people: Gerardo Rocha-Haardt; Jorge Vidal; Mauricio Guerrero
- Products: Lunar rover
- Owner: Gerardo Rocha-Haardt
- Number of employees: 34
- Parent: AngelicvM Foundation

Team AngelicvM is a private company based in Chile that plans to deploy a small rover on the Moon.

In 2024 their rover, called Unity, was one of the various lunar rovers that were carried by the commercial Peregrine lander. Peregrine, which was manufactured by Astrobotic Technology experienced a propellant leak after launch which led to it burning in Earth's atmosphere, never reaching the Moon.

== History ==
Team AngelicvM was created in 2010 in Santiago, Chile, with the purpose to compete for the Google Lunar X Prize. This international competition offered US$20 million for the first privately developed rover to land on the Moon, travel at least 500 meters, and transmit high-definition video and images back to Earth. Since no team was able to make a launch attempt to reach the Moon by the 31 March 2018 deadline, the Google Lunar XPRIZE went unclaimed and the competition ended without a winner, but AngelicvM plans to go ahead with the rover's development and launch.

Team AngelicvM is financed by AngelicvM Foundation (Inversiones AngelicvM); its owner and President is Gerardo Rocha-Haardt, who by 2012 had financed about US$3 million. Rocha-Haardt explained that since there is no space agency in Chile, he hopes to inspire and stimulate the private sector's participation in the outer space economy. Rocha-Haardt invited all Chilean universities to participate in the project. They were joined by the Universidad de Concepción and Universidad Austral de Chile, who are developing the rover.

AngelicvM signed a contract with Astrobotic Technology in 2015 to have their rover carried on board Astrobotic's Peregrine lander, and in July 2017, Astrobotic announced an agreement had been reached with United Launch Alliance for the launch. As of May 2018, Astrobotic's first Peregrine lander mission is reported to have 12 customers, and is planned to be launched in 2020 on an Atlas V rocket. The selected landing site is Lacus Mortis. The lander's commercial payload include Team Hakuto's rover.

== Unity rover ==
The first rover's concept was called Dandelion. Its body was spherical of about 10 cm in diameter with a flat top and bottom. It uses two bilateral "legged" wheels for traction and it keeps upright by a pendulum. This light traction concept was inspired by insect legs, and it was considered because that is what all insects evolved for efficient displacement on uneven surfaces. Adding some flexibility to each blade/leg, it imitates the tendon in the insect leg and holds potential energy for better traction. Preliminary tests performed in Chile's Atacama desert were reported to surpass their predicted expectations.

AngelicvM's current rover concept is a 5 kg, four-wheeled rover called Unity.

The team has 34 members, all professionals and mostly volunteers. Their transmission to Earth will be a high-definition music video that carries "a message of faith, hope, peace and unity to the World.
