= Barcelona Moon Team =

Barcelona Moon Team is a Spanish team led by Galactic Suite Design, which is participating in the Google Lunar X Prize.

== History ==
Galactic Suite Design (GSD) is the lead company in a consortium of companies fielding the Barcelona Moon Team in the Google Lunar X Prize (GLXP) competition. GSD does so through a filial company, Galactic Suite Moon Race. BMT is the official candidate to the GLXP. The team is a multidisciplinary joint venture bringing together Spanish entrepreneurial, industrial and academic capabilities. The team also includes the Centre of Aerospace Technology in Barcelona (CTAE), the Polytechnic University of Catalonia (UPC) or the international engineering advisory firm Altran. BMT wants to promote a widening involvement of private initiative in the development of space technology and industry, also including sectors such as exploration and tourism.

The Barcelona Moon Team GXLP mission was scheduled to launch aboard a Chinese Long March 2C in June 2015. The China Great Wall Industry Corporation (CGWIC) was planned to be launching team Barcelona Moon in June 2015.

But later, the team withdrew from the competition.
