= Planetary Transportation Systems =

German aerospace company

Planetary Transportation Systems GmbH
- Company type: Private
- Industry: Aerospace
- Founded: 2009
- Founder: Robert Böhme
- Fate: Active
- Headquarters: Berlin, Germany
- Products: Lunar lander
- Services: Lunar transportation
- Website: pts.space

Planetary Transportation Systems (PTS), formerly known as PTScientists and Part-Time Scientists, is a Berlin-based aerospace company. They developed the robotic lunar lander "ALINA" and seek to land on the Moon with it. They became the first German team to officially enter the Google Lunar X-Prize competition on June 24, 2009, but failed to reach the finals in 2017 for lack of a launch contract. During the summer of 2019, the company filed for bankruptcy, and the ALINA project was put on hold. In July 2021, PTS was selected with ArianeGroup to build ESA's ASTRIS kick-stage.

== PTScientists GmbH ==
PTScientists GmbH is the company representing the team competing at the Google Lunar X-Prize. The company opened offices in Berlin-Mahlsdorf in 2015. It sells payload for the Moon mission to individuals, organizations and companies. The cost for one kilogram of payload is between €700,000 and €800,000. Furthermore, the know-how of the team is available as a consulting service. As of April 2018, the European Space Agency was studying six private companies, including PTScientists, to work on potential ISRU payload delivery to the Moon surface by 2025.

An additional source of income are merchandising products for the Moon mission. PTScientists lists several partners and sponsors in their web site.

== History ==
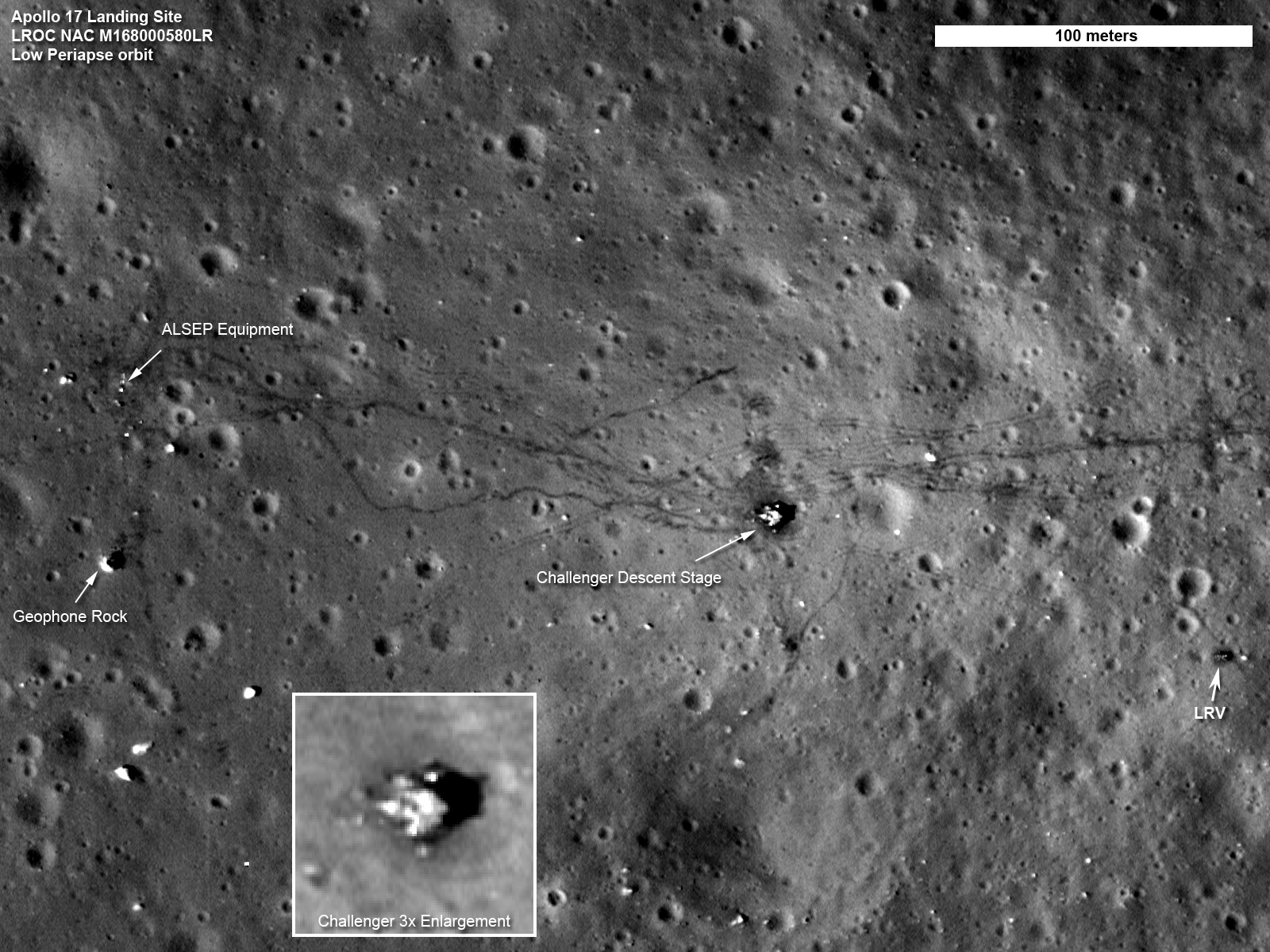
The planned landing site for ALINA is next to the Apollo 17 lander, located at Taurus–Littrow

The PTScientists team formed in June 2009 as "Part-Time Scientists", when ten teams had already entered Google Lunar X-Prize (GLXP), which had started in 2007. Later the company PTScientists GmbH (Limited) was founded.

On August 22–23, 2009, the PTScientists presented their project at the Open Doors Day of the Federal Ministry for Education and Research.

On December 28, 2009, the team presented their mission at the 26th annual Chaos Communication Congress. In a two-hour presentation, the team provided a detailed overview of all parts of the project. This was the first time the European-made private lunar rover prototype had been presented to the public.

Early 2015 the team won awards in the categories Mobility and Vision, and a total of $750,000 in the Milestone Prizes of GLXP.

During the Advertising Festival in Cannes, on June 23, 2015, Audi was announced as a main sponsor and the rover developer. As a result of this cooperation, the two identical rovers were named Audi Lunar Quattro during the 2016 North American International Auto Show in Detroit.

== Planned demo mission to the Moon ==
ALINA (Autonomous Landing and Navigation Module)
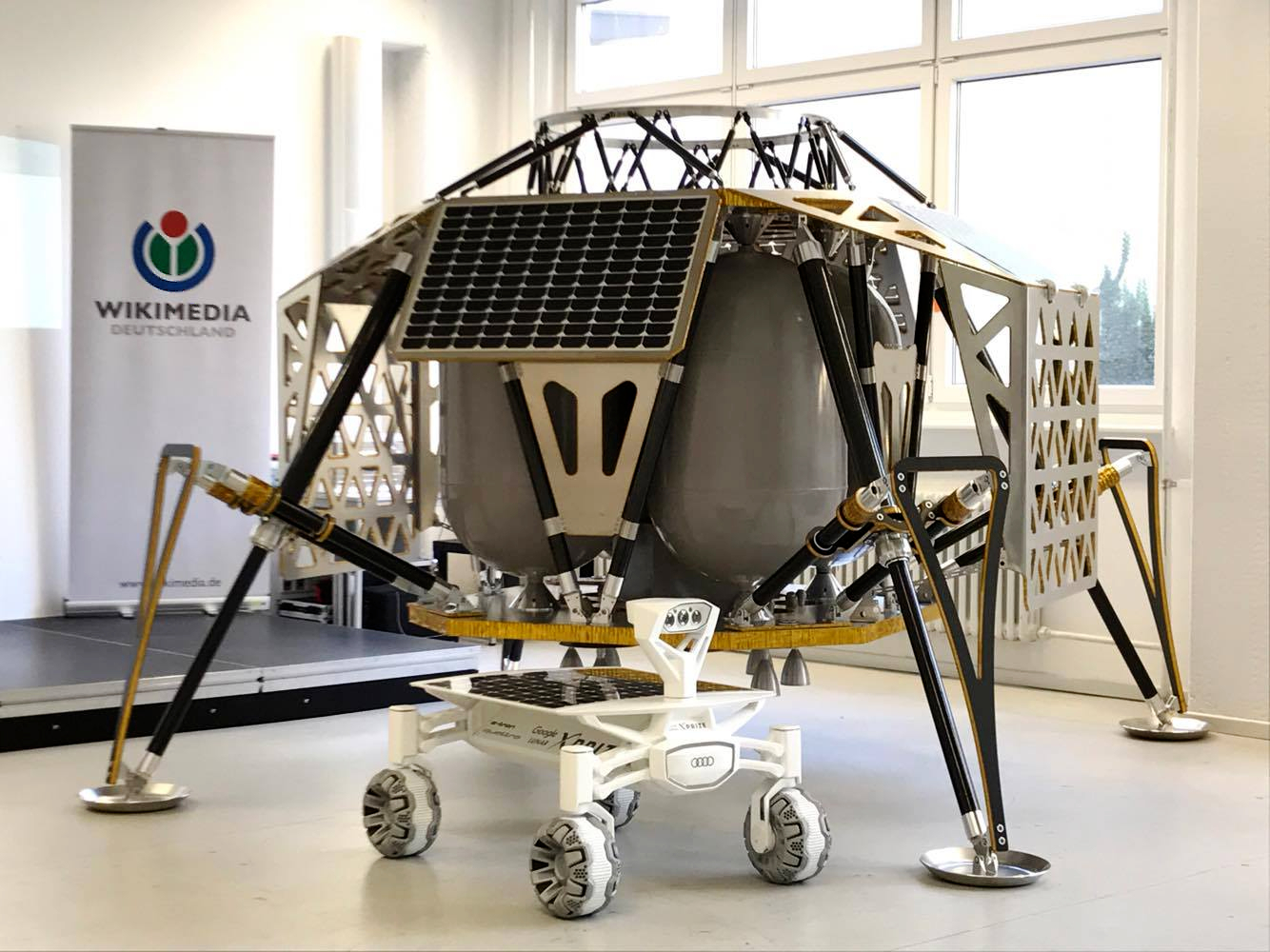
- ALINA lander and ALQ rover
- Mission type: Robotic lander and 2 rovers
- Operator: PTScientists
- Website: mission-to-the-moon.com
- Mission duration: one lunar day (28 days) maximum

Spacecraft properties
- Spacecraft: ALINA
- Spacecraft type: lunar lander
- Manufacturer: PTScientists
- Launch mass: 1,250 kg (2,760 lb)
- Landing mass: ALINA: ~320 kg (710 lb); Rovers: 30 kg (66 lb) each
- Dry mass: ALINA: 220 kg (490 lb); Fuel mass: 930 kg (2,050 lb)
- Payload mass: ALINA: 100 kg (220 lb) max. Rovers: 5 kg (11 lb) max. each
- Dimensions: ALINA: 2.6 m × 2.2 m × 1.8 m Rovers:
- Power: ALINA: Rovers: 90 W

Start of mission
- Launch date: TBD
- Rocket: Ariane 64
- Contractor: ArianeGroup

Moon rover
- Spacecraft component: Audi Lunar Quattro-1 (ALQ-1) and Audi Lunar Quattro-2 (ALQ-2)
- Landing site: Taurus–Littrow

Transponders
- Band: X band and S band

In March 2017, the group announced that they planned to perform the world's first private Moon landing with a mission they now simply call "Mission to the Moon". A landing module called Autonomous Landing and Navigation Module (ALINA) would launch in 2021 on an Ariane 64 rocket to the surface of the Moon.

The ALINA lander would deploy two lunar rovers, but none of the three spacecraft are designed to endure the long lunar night. The three spacecraft are technology demonstrators to showcase the lander's capabilities, including landing near the desired landing zone, roving, and real-time communication.

By late 2016, PTScientists had secured agreements to deliver payloads from the U.S., Canada and Sweden, but only one payload (from NASA Ames) has been disclosed.

=== ALINA lander ===
ALINA is a lunar lander with a launch mass of 1,250 kg (2,760 lb) and a landing mass of about 320 kg (710 lb). Its main engines are in a cluster of eight, each generating 200 newtons. It also features eight attitude control thrusters generating 10 newtons each. ALINA is built to host three general types of payload, which are rovers, stationary and orbital (deployment of CubeSats), but for its first mission it will deploy two rovers and no satellites.

This mission aims to land 3 to 5 km (1.9 to 3.1 mi) away from the Apollo 17 landing site in the Taurus–Littrow lunar valley, to locate and film from a distance the Lunar Roving Vehicle left there by NASA astronauts Eugene Cernan and Harrison Schmitt in 1972 during the Apollo 17 mission. PTScientists have pledged to preserve this and all other NASA and Soviet lunar landers and rovers as "world heritage" and through their support for For All Moonkind Inc.

=== ALQ rovers ===
The Audi Lunar Quattro (ALQ) rovers are being developed by German automobile manufacturer Audi. The prototype rover is called Asimov Jr. R3, while the two flight rovers are named Audi Lunar Quattro (ALQ). The rovers feature four-wheel drive tranmision where each wheel is able to pivot 360° for special maneuvers, and their solar panel is able to tilt in the direction of the Sun for best power generation.

The rovers' projected maximum speed is 3.6 km/h (2.2 mph), and they will carry two stereo cameras to acquire 3D images, mounted to a moving head at the front of the vehicle. ALINA lander will communicate with the rovers using technology based on Infineon chips, Nokia, and Vodafone's 4G LTE. In turn, the lander will communicate with Earth Control using the European Space Operations Centre (ESTRACK) network.

=== Payload ===
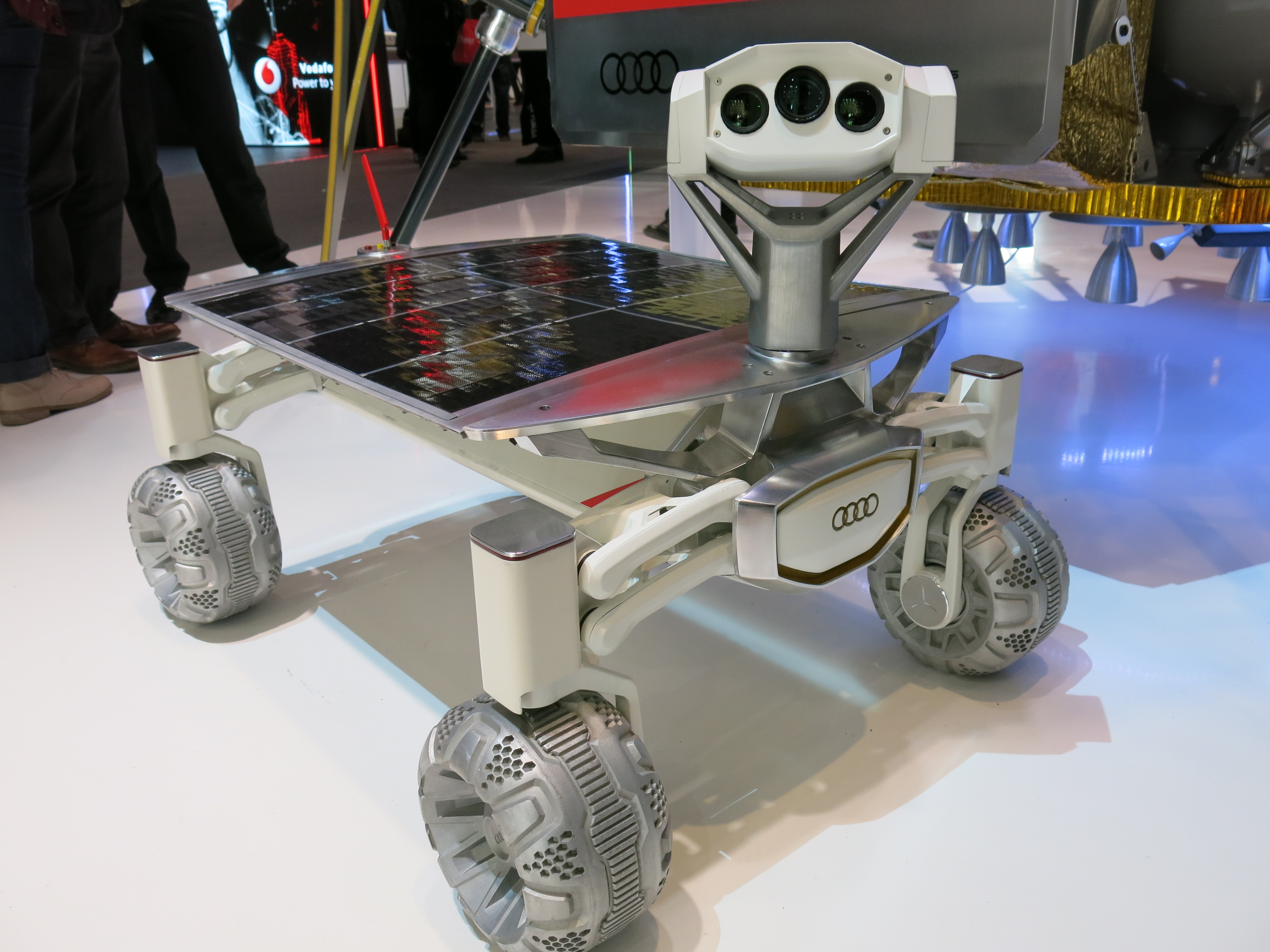
Audi Lunar Rover (ALR)

In addition of hardware for a live video broadcast, the lander and rovers will carry commercial or scientific instruments for a fee. The lander, ALINA, has a capacity for 100 kg (220 lb) including the two 30 kg rovers, and each rover has a capacity for 5 kg (11 lb) payload.

During its first mission, the lander is envisaged to carry three customer payloads, including an experiment designed by NASA Ames, called Lunar Plant Growth Experiment (LPX). This is an experiment for investigating germination and initial plant growth when subject to the combined effects of lunar gravity and lunar surface radiation. The experiment will try to grow Arabidopsis (a flowering plant), basil, sunflowers, and turnips in a sealed "biosphere" cylinder about 10 cm in diameter with life-support systems. A miniature camera will photograph any growth. Research in such closed ecological systems inform astrobiology and the development of biological life support systems for long duration missions in space stations or space habitats for space farming.

== ESA lander study ==
In January 2019, ESA contractor Ariane Group announced that it has received a one-year contract from ESA to study a lunar lander concept to mine lunar regolith to extract natural resources. PTScientists were awarded a subcontract and are responsible for the payload delivery portion of the study. The mission would be launched on an Ariane 64 in 2025.
