= Euroluna =

The European Lunar Exploration Association (Euroluna) is a Danish-Italian-Swiss team led by Palle Haastrup, which is participating in the Google Lunar X Prize Challenge.

== The team ==
The members of the Euroluna team are:

- Palle Haastrup
- Søren Rasmussen
- Tor Foss Mortensen
- Sten Haastrup
- Erik Haastrup
- Mogens Rasmussen
- Signe Terkelsen

== Lunar Rover ==
As of 2008, EuroLuna was designing a lightweight solar-powered four-wheeled Luna Rover called ROMIT, which will be pared down to just 110 pounds by minimising redundant systems.

== Sources ==
- News article in Danish
- Euroluna website

== See also ==
- Lunar Rover
- Lunokhod programme
