= DHL MoonBox =

Box contained within 2024 moon launch

DHL MoonBox was a mementos box that was launched to the Moon on Astrobotic Technology's Peregrine Lunar Lander in 2024. 151 MoonBox capsules, also known as "Moonpods", were made by DHL, each containing items intended to be shipped to the lunar surface. The capsules measured up to 1 inch wide and 2 inches high (2.5 by 5.1 cm), and contained items from the USA, UK, Canada, Nepal, Germany and Belgium. The items included stories written by children and a rock from Mount Everest. DHL also included a data stick which contained 100,000 images from those who responded to its "Who do you love to the moon and back?" campaign.

Landing of the Peregrine on the moon was later abandoned due to a propellant leak. It re-entered Earth's atmosphere and was destroyed on 18 January 2024.

== Payloads ==
The payloads in the Moonbox include:

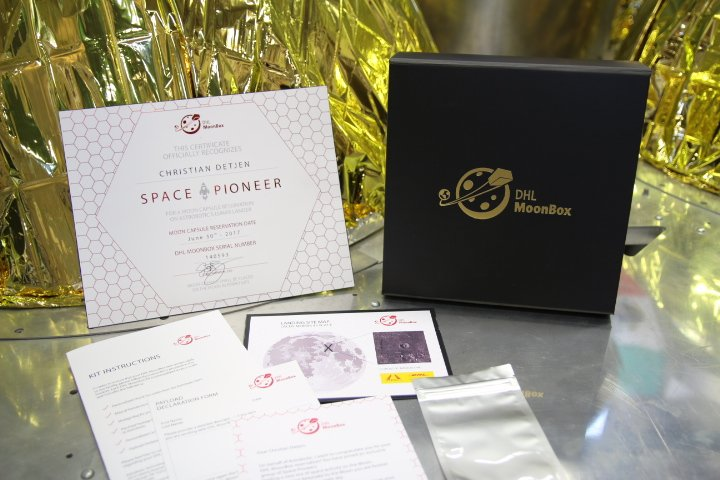
DHL Moonbox

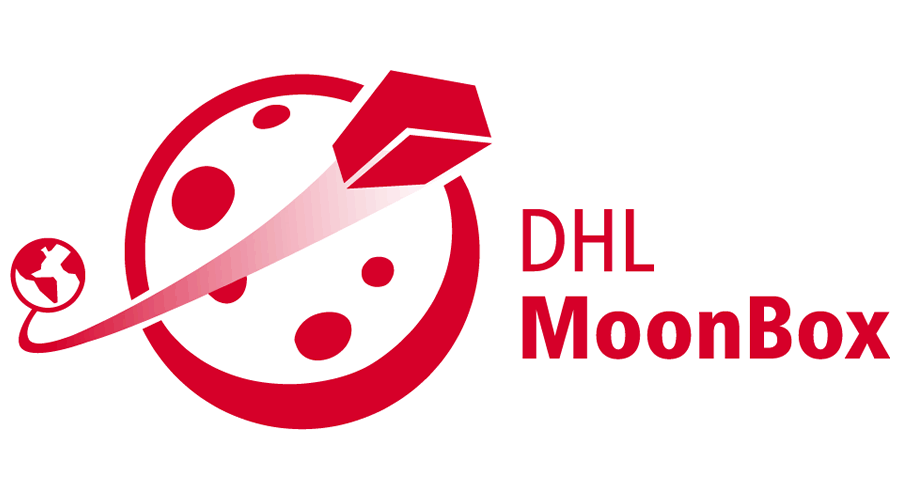
DHL MoonBox logo

Country	Name	Agency, company or person
USA	Mora Moon Museum	Project Mora
UK		Anthony Henderson
USA	Gray Crater 1	SWIRVRO
Canada	The Lunar Codex	Incandence
USA	Conrad Moonwalker Drive	The Conrad Foundation
USA	I Need More Moon	TJ Cooney
USA	moon my name	Ian Sager
USA	HopeMoonshot	Pennsylvania State University
USA	Digital Files	Future Grind
Canada	Moonstone	Incandence
UK	Astro Liz’s Lab Sticker	Elizabeth Norman Astro Liz’s Lab
Belgium	Belgium2theMoon Timecapsule	Belgium2theMoon
UK	Apollo Remastered	Andy Saunders
Germany	ToTheMoonWithDHL	DHL
USA	Kennywood Token	Heinz History Center
USA	International Library on the Moon	Writers on the Moon
USA	MoonBox	MrBeast
Nepal	Nepal Robotics payload	Nepal Robotics Project
USA	Consmith Capsule	Matthew Congrove
USA	Dogecoin to the moon	Dogecoin
USA	Interstellar Archive	Dominion Worldwide
USA		u/Valphon
USA		Howdy Bots - FRC #6377
USA		Balko Public School
USA		Big Brothers Big Sisters of America
UK		Into the Red // PRE-SAVE TO THE MOON
USA		Ohio PC Solutions
Canada		2 the Moon! For Real
USA		GadgetNate
USA		Civil Air Patrol and Cornell NanoScale Science and Technology Facility
USA		The Earthling Project
UK		Great Baddow High School
CanadaUSA	Writers on the Moon: Stories by 133 authors	https://www.writersonthemoon.com
France	VLC Lunar Time Capsule	VLC media player https://lunartimecapsule.space/
