= BlastOff! Corporation =

American aerospace company

Blastoff! Corporation was a small aerospace company in Pasadena, California, that operated from 1999 to early 2001 as one of dozens of Idealab's incubator companies, created to capitalize on the public interest in space travel and exploration.

== Summary ==
The company Blastoff! Corporation was first formed as Spacelab in 1999, but was quickly renamed to Blastoff! to differentiate it from the NASA Spacelab Space Shuttle module. The company was developed and acted in secret throughout its short existence.

The company’s mission was to do entertainment space missions: flights that would pay for themselves through the sales of advertising, media content, action figures, etc. thus, Blastoff! differed from other companies espousing similar goals in that it was decided not to promote its development work and that Blastoff!’s first mission was fully funded.

Blastoff!'s first mission rapidly evolved from an initial concept of human space tourism to its final plan of sending a robotic lander/rover to the Moon. The size of the company grew from less than ten employees in January 2000, to a peak of approximately 59 full-time employees in October 2000. Due to funding constraints, the company effectively closed down in January 2001.

== Participants ==
The approximately 50 direct employees of Blastoff! came from different aerospace and non-aerospace backgrounds across the United States. Approximately 35 of the employees were engineers, with backgrounds from both small and large aerospace organizations. Other employees were responsible for financing, marketing, and famously the cinematography organization of the mission (this included recognizable Hollywood directors and producers). Many well-known aerospace companies were enlisted as subcontractors to provide most of the subsystems on the spacecraft.

== L1 mission ==
The only concept mission at Blastoff! was to send a robotic lander/rover spacecraft to the Moon. The proposed mission was named Lunar 1, or L1 for short. The robotic element of the mission would have three parts: a Rover, and two smaller Scouts. The L1 mission was to follow a direct lunar injection trajectory, rather than performing several Earth orbits prior to performing an engine fire to leave orbit. The launch vehicle contracted for the L1 mission was the last of the Athena series (prior to Athena's reactivation in 2010).

The Rover was to contain all of the hardware necessary to navigate to the Moon, execute a soft landing on its surface, move overland to its destination, and communicate with the Earth throughout the entire mission. The Rover was similar in size to the two NASA rovers (Spirit and Opportunity) that successfully landed on Mars in January 2004, and had similar mobility functionality.

The Scouts were to act as remote extensions of the main Rover craft, and contained power systems, video cameras and limited local communication systems that could only communicate directly with the Rover. The Scouts were about six by twelve inches and were deployed from the Rover after the Rover performed a soft landing on the surface of the Moon. The Scouts could be used in a reconnaissance function to identify upcoming travel hazards, and also performed a "third person" video perspective to show the Rover itself on the surface of the Moon.

The destination of the Rover and Scouts was to be one of the NASA Apollo landing sites, most likely the Apollo 11 landing site (the first human landing on the Moon). The mission was designed to land the Rover and Scouts as close to the Apollo site as possible at the beginning of that site's local lunar day. This would provide a two-week time period with continuous sunlight to power the Rover and Scouts before the two-week lunar night would effectively end the mission by causing the batteries to drain. Throughout this two-week period daytime period, the Rover and Scouts' location would be identified relative to the Apollo site, and the robotic craft would be remotely driven from the Earth to arrive at the Apollo site prior to lunar nightfall.

The L1 mission and hardware design was developed and finalized through an engineering effort in 2000. An intense targeted marketing and funding campaign also took place during this time, but without adequate results to maintain company liquidity. A majority of the hardware to build the system had been ordered, and some had been received by the time the company shut down in January 2001. The L1 project was not perpetuated after the company's shutdown, and so the Rover and Scouts never were completed and launched.
