= Audi Lunar Quattro =

Lunar rover

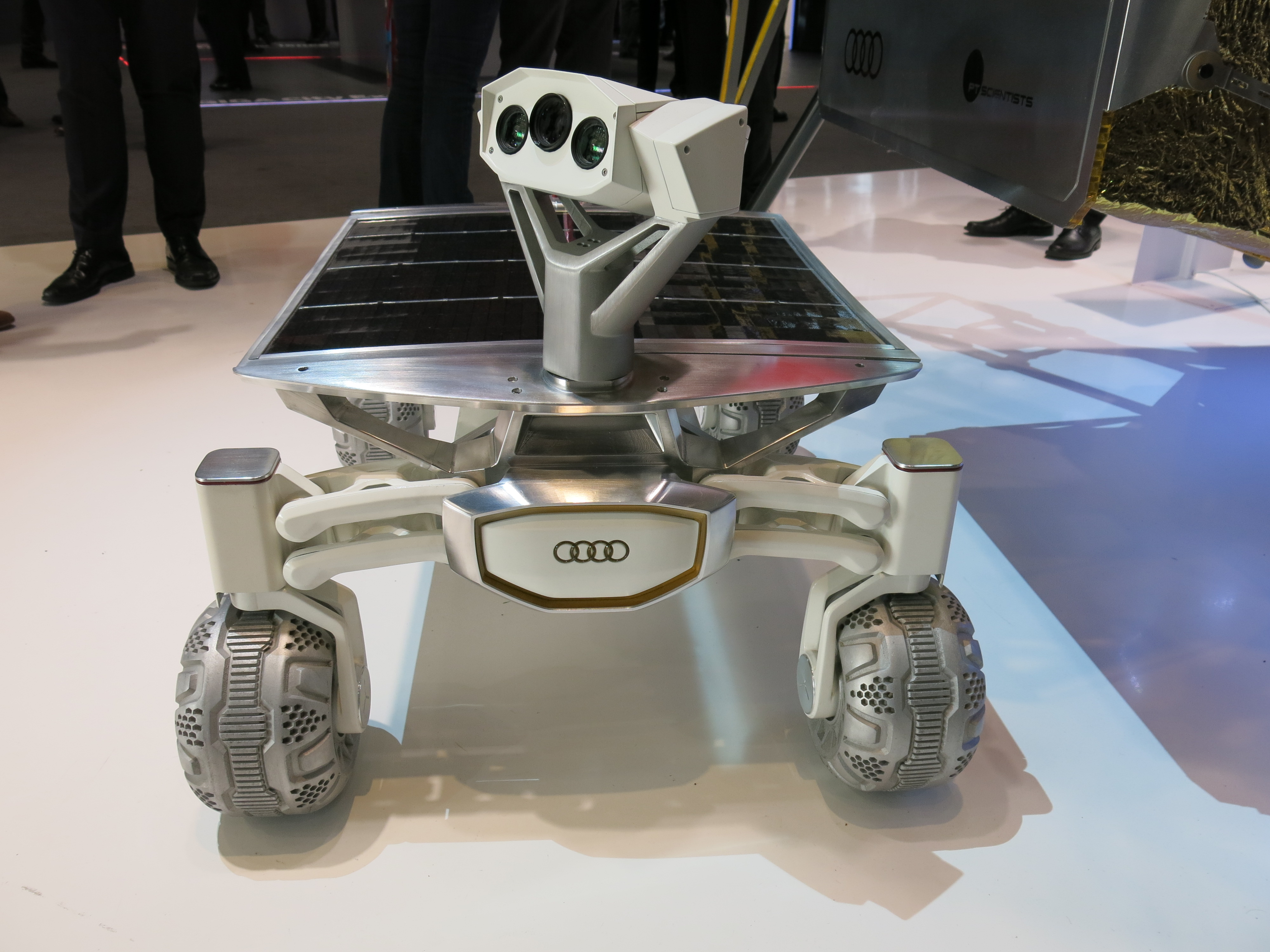
Audi Lunar Quattro

Audi Lunar Quattro (ALQ) is type of small lunar rover created by a team of engineers from Germany, PTScientists, with the support of Audi and a number of scientists and companies from different countries in 2015.

The rover made a brief media appearance in "Alien (Covenant)" as part of a collaboration between Audi and Twentieth Century Fox.

The flight to the Moon was planned for October 2021 on board a SpaceX Falcon 9 two-stage rocket, but did not proceed. No further announcements on the apparent launch have been made. The rover is made from magnesium-based alloys. The total mass of the lunar rover is 35 kg, and will be capable of a maximum speed of 3.6 km/h. Its four electric motors are powered by solar panels and lithium-ion batteries.
