= 4Frontiers Corporation =

American space commerce company

- Type: Private
- Industry: Aerospace; NewSpace; Mars
- Founded: 2005
- Headquarters: New Port Richey, Florida, United States
- Area served: Worldwide
- Key people: Mark Homnick (CEO); Joseph E. Palaia, IV (Vice-President of R&D)
- Products: Space & Mars settlement research & development consulting informative entertainment
- Number of employees: 3 (2008)
- Website: 4FrontiersCorp.com

4Frontiers Corporation is an American space commerce company, founded in 2005.

== History ==
In 2014, 4Frontiers began a private placement round of financing to raise US$15–20 million to fund part of US$80 million required to build the first phase of INTERSPACE Florida, "a real science interactive space themed destination" on a 75 acres (30 ha) parcel of land near Titusville Cocoa Airport.

== Organization ==
The company is headquartered in New Port Richey, Florida, and has three employees. The majority of work is completed by contractors, consultants, and interns. Consultants and advisers for 4Frontiers include Buzz Aldrin, Ben Bova, Christopher McKay, and Marianne Dyson.

== See also ==
- Colonization of Mars
- Exploration of Mars
- Flashline Mars Arctic Research Station
- Mars Analog Research Station Program
