= Interorbital Systems =

American aerospace company

Interorbital Systems Corporation
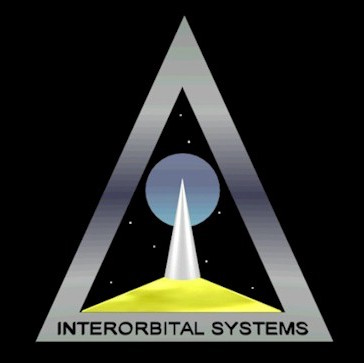
- Industry: Aerospace
- Founded: 1996
- Headquarters: Mojave, California
- Key people: Rod Milliron and Randa Milliron (founders)
- Products: rocket engines, rocket launch
- Number of employees: 12 (2017)
- Website: http://www.interorbital.com/

Interorbital Systems (IOS) is an American space development company based in Mojave, California. It was established in 1996 by Roderick and Randa Milliron. As of October 2023, the company is in development stage for three orbital launch vehicles: NEPTUNE, TRITON, and TRITON HEAVY.

Interorbital Systems has participated in the development of a launch vehicle for the Google Lunar X Prize Team Synergy Moon and has provided suborbital commercial launch services. For orbital launch, they have so far facilitated launches with ISRO and Jaxa. Additionally, the company participated as a competitor in the Ansari X Prize and America's Space Prize competitions.

== Rocket designs ==
=== NEUTRINO Sounding Rocket ===
Interorbital's first rocket was the NEUTRINO a liquid fueled pressure-fed bipropellant sounding rocket powered by an in-house GPRE 0.5NFA engine. It was 20ft in length, 8in in diameter with a gross mass of 380lbs and with a payload mass of 5lb that could reach an apogee of 65 miles. Three NEUTRINOs would be launched between 1999 and 2001 with no subsequent attempts. By 2009 the FAA still classified the NEUTRINO as an “additional conceptual vehicle” with the rocket never beginning the routine flights Interorbital had hoped for.

=== TACHYON Sounding Rocket ===
In 2006, IOS held an active launch license from the Office of Commercial Space Transportation for Tachyon, a sounding rocket designed for suborbital flights reaching an apogee of 120 miles.

=== SOLARIS Launch Vehicle ===
Solaris was a suborbital rocket design developed by IOS in the early 2000s. The intention behind the Solaris project was to compete for the Ansari X Prize. However, the rocket was not completed in time, and it was surpassed by Scaled Composites' SpaceShipOne, which successfully claimed the prize.

=== NEPTUNE Launch Vehicle ===
The NEPTUNE rocket would use high-performance liquid oxygen and densified propane propellants. Its primary element was the Common Propulsion Module, or CPM, equipped with four stationary throttleable ablatively cooled liquid rocket engines, each capable of generating 4,500 pounds of thrust. Throttling of these engines allows for precise control of pitch, yaw, and roll during flight. Other versions used a single, 7,500-lb thrust engine, and/or a mixture of WFNA and turpentine for propellants.

All versions would be fed propellants through a proprietary pressurant system, claimed to reduce the weight of the propellant tank/pressurant system to an equivalent of a traditional pump-fed system. By removing the propellant pump and the associated heavy electric or gas-generator pump-drive system, Interorbital Systems proposes to significantly reduce both the overall rocket development cost and the manufacturing time, leading to cost savings and improved efficiency in the manufacturing process.

The NEPTUNE N1 rocket is proposed to use a single CPM, combined with a liquid-fuel upper stage powered by a single stationary ablatively cooled liquid rocket engine that generates 3,000 pounds of thrust, for a total height of 36 ft (11 m) and mass of 5,400 lb (2,400 kg). During the second stage engine burn and while in orbit, pitch, yaw, and roll control would be provided by cold-gas thrusters. The N3, N5, and N7 were planned to be using 3, 5 and 7 CPMs respectively, while carrying 18, 30 and 75kg to 310km polar circular orbit. Another proposed version was the N36, using 36 CPMs for a payload of 1000kg to LEO, proposed to carry the Synergy Moon lander for the Google Lunar X Prize and a notional 2-person crew capsule. Other sources call N5 the "Neptune 30" (after its intended payload mass) and have the 1000kg configuration with only 33 CPMs, and also mention a 84-unit Neptune 4000, intended to carry a six-person space tourism capsule.

All Interorbital Systems (IOS) rockets are described as being launchable from an ocean barge equipped with motion compensation technology. Initially, IOS plans to conduct orbital flights from the Pacific Ocean southwest of Los Angeles.

==== Milestones ====
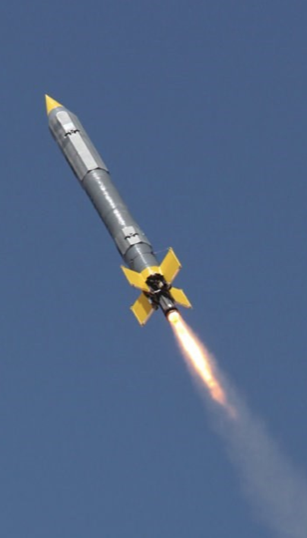
Test flight of the single CPM on March 29th, 2014 with four payloads on board.

The main engine of the Common Propulsion Module (CPM) underwent its first successful static engine firing on October 28, 2012. This composite chambered engine generated 7,500 pounds of thrust and used nitric acid and turpentine propellants.

A boilerplate of the Common Propulsion Module Test Vehicle (CPM TV) weighing 1,200 lb (540 kg) with its payload completed its inaugural test flight on March 29, 2014, achieving a maximum altitude of 10,000 feet. The payloads on board included two CubeSats, a payload from Synergy Moon, and a music CD titled "ENCLOSURE" by John Frusciante, former guitarist of the Red Hot Chili Peppers. The CPM TV will be reused for future test flights, and all payloads were successfully recovered without damage.

== Satellite kits ==
The CubeSat Personal Satellite Kit is available in two configurations: a standard 1 kg (2.2 lb) version and a non-standard 1.33 kg (2.93 lb) version. These kits are constructed using an aluminum frame and are designed for conducting simple experiments, as well as for receiving and transmitting radio signals. They may also be used for personal purposes.

The TubeSat Personal Satellite Kit offers an alternative to CubeSats. These kits are constructed entirely from printed circuit boards, and is in the shape of a 16-sided prism with an 8.94 cm (3.52 in) outside diameter and 12.7 cm (5.0 in) length, totaling 0.75 kg (1.7 lb) mass, of which 0.25 kg (0.55 lb) is user payload.

According to their claims, the kits will be launched into self-decaying orbits at an altitude of 310 km (192 mi), eventually burning up in the Earth's atmosphere after several weeks. The company has a significant number of launches planned for both types of satellites.

=== EAK-Orbitals ===
EAK-Orbitals, a South African aerospace startup specializing in tubesat and cubesat earth observation satellites for mineral and infrastructure detection, work with interorbitals as a kit provider and soon to be launch provider for the first scheduled orbital launches, EAK-Orbitals plans to launch 30+ satellites by 2030, using interorbitals tubesat and cubesat kits alongside half being launched via interorbitals themself.

== Google Lunar XPrize ==
Interorbital Systems became a member and launch provider for Team Synergy Moon in the Google Lunar X Prize competition in June 2016. The team proposed using a modified version of the NEPTUNE rocket consisting of 36 modules to transport their lunar rover to the surface of the Moon.

== See also ==
- Private spaceflight
- Orbital spaceflight
- Sub-orbital spaceflight
- OTRAG, which used a similar modular rocket design
- Mojave Air and Space Port
- Team Synergy Moon
- FreeFly Astronaut Project
