= Selenokhod =

Team Selenokhod (Russian: Селеноход) is a privately funded Russian team of aerospace experts led by Nikolay Dzis-Voynarovskiy. It was the first Russian team to enter the Google Lunar X Prize competition.

On 18 December 2013, the team has decided to withdraw from the competition.

== History and development ==
The team's name is derived from Lunokhod, the Soviet space program that sent two remote-controlled rovers to the Moon, which became the first rovers to traverse the Moon's surface. The team initially began work in October 2007, composed of nearly ten experienced engineers and managers. The team's vehicles are two rovers and a lander with a communications system on board. Both 5 kg rovers contain four independent wheels, an HD camera, a solar panel, rechargeable batteries and a low-gain, omni-directional antenna.

== Objectives ==
As of 2009, the team articulated four general objectives:

- To demonstrate for all to see that progress in space can be achieved for the benefit of commerce and society, and that other programs besides those run by the military and the government can succeed.
- To identify and exploit the previously unknown talents and true creative potential of many people who join our Team and embrace the goals of the Project.
- To help reclaim Russia's premier status in the realm of space, and to help instill a sense of renewed pride in the Russian national space program as a whole.
- To do our best to win the Google Lunar X PRIZE, which means landing the first private rover on the lunar surface, and then successfully accomplishing all the required tasks and procedures in full compliance with the rules of the competition.

== See also ==
- Russian space program
- Soviet space program
- Soviet Moonshot
- N1 (rocket)
- LK Lander
- Soyuz 7K-L3
