= Puli Space Technologies =

Hungarian aerospace company

- Company type: Private
- Industry: space industry
- Founded: 2010
- Headquarters: Hungary
- Key people: Dr. Tibor Pacher ^{CEO, founder} Pál Gábor Vizi ^{CSO, founder}
- Website: www.PuliSpace.com

Puli Space Technologies (named after the puli, a small Hungarian dog breed) is a Hungarian company established by individuals in June 2010 in order to take part in Google Lunar X Prize Challenge and other competitions, and further to facilitate development of space industry in Hungary, to promote scientific thinking and encourage students to choose scientific careers.

== Google Lunar X Prize ==
Official button of Team Puli

By the end of August 2010, the Team finished a "Letter of Intent", and by October 2010 the fundraising started. On 11 January 2011 the team announced it transferred the registration fee. The registration (together with the last eight teams) was announced on 17 February 2011.

== Puli spacecraft ==
The Puli spacecraft was planned to be finished by 2014. It was planned to be launched by a commercial carrier rocket, and to reach the Moon on its own.

In the team's early concept traveling on the lunar surface was planned to be achieved by changing the spherical lander's center of mass, making it roll. Later they redesigned the rover to run on four "wheg" (wheel of legs) structures. During 2012 the second, bigger rover of that concept (Iteration 2) was constructed and underwent running tests.

== See also ==
- MaSat-1
