= Hakuto =

Japanese aerospace team

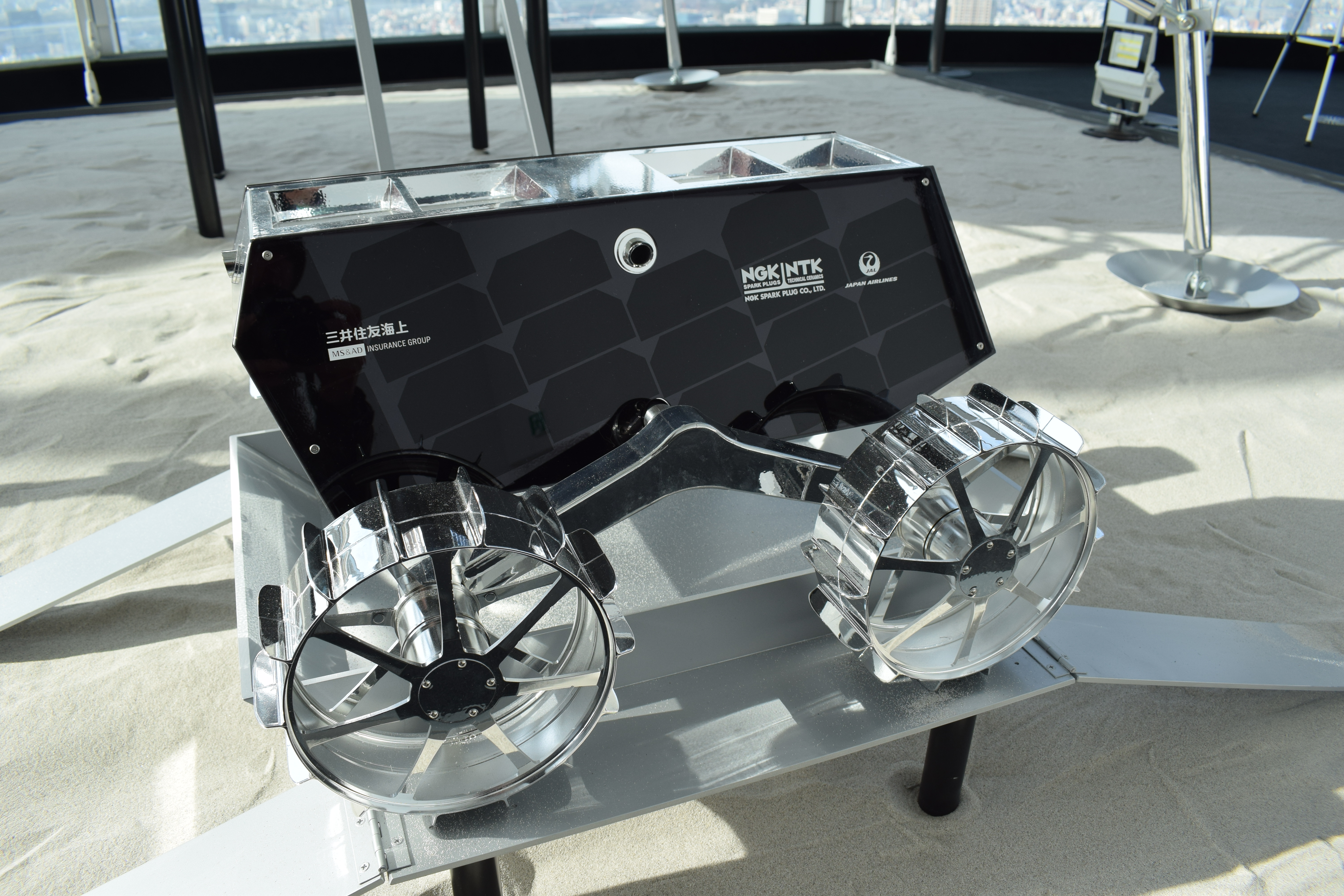
Hakuto's lunar rover called Sorato, model circa 2014

Hakuto (ハクト) or formerly White Label Space (ホワイトレーベルスペース) was a team formed in early 2008 by a group of experienced space professionals inspired by the challenge of the Google Lunar X PRIZE to develop a robotic Moon exploration mission.

Hakuto was named after the white rabbit in Japanese mythology. The team's original plan was to finance its lunar mission from advertising expenditure of large global companies and the team eventually succeeded in attracting sponsorship from multiple large brands, particularly in Japan. The team went through a number of phases of its organisation and plans. Initially the team was primarily a European effort and led in the Netherlands. Later the team changed management and was led in Japan. At different stages of the competition the team had partnerships with two other teams (Astrobotic and then Team Indus) for the delivery of its lunar rover to the Moon's surface. Although the competition ended without any team launching their mission, the Hakuto team became a company, struck partnerships, working agreements and became ispace.

== History ==
In 2008, White Label Space was founded in the Netherlands. In 2009, the team registered with the Google Lunar X PRIZE (GLXP). The business plan of White Label Space aimed to make a new type of space technology company that was both attractive to sponsors and also technically strong.

Throughout the period 2008 till 2010 the team established partnerships with a number of organisations, mostly in Europe, and White Label Space continued to publish its early progress on the developments of the lunar mission. On September 10, 2010 Japan-based members of the team established White Label Space Japan LLC, a Limited Liability Company registered in Japan. On June 11, 2012, it was decided to name unit 2 Rover prototype (PM-2) "White Rabbit" (written in hiragana as「はくと」, which is pronounced "Hakuto").

On January 30, 2013, the European team members had ceased substantial involvement and the Japan-based members decided to continue the work, establishing a new parent company called ispace Inc. The change included a change of leadership from Steve Allen to co-founder Takeshi Hakamada. Around that time the team also announced the lead engineer as Kazuya Yoshida, a professor of aerospace engineering at Tohoku University in Japan.

On July 15, 2013 the team publicly announced the change the official team name to Hakuto (「ハクト」). On December 4, 2013, the team successfully crowd-funded the development of unit 3 Rover prototype (PM-3).

On February 19, 2014, Hakuto was selected in the Milestone Prizes as one of five teams competing in the mobility subsystem section.

By 2014, carrying through on the initial vision of the White Label Space team, the Hakuto team had succeeded in obtaining sponsorship from a number of major Japanese brands for its lunar mission.

Following on from the cessation of the GLXP the leader of the Hakuto GLXP team, ispace Inc., retained the support of KDDI, JAL and Suzuki, and proceeded to build further corporate partnerships as well as raising large amounts of venture capital funding directed towards an expanded lunar mission program. The Sorato rover was donated to the US National Air and Space Museum in October 2019.

=== Lunar mission plans ===
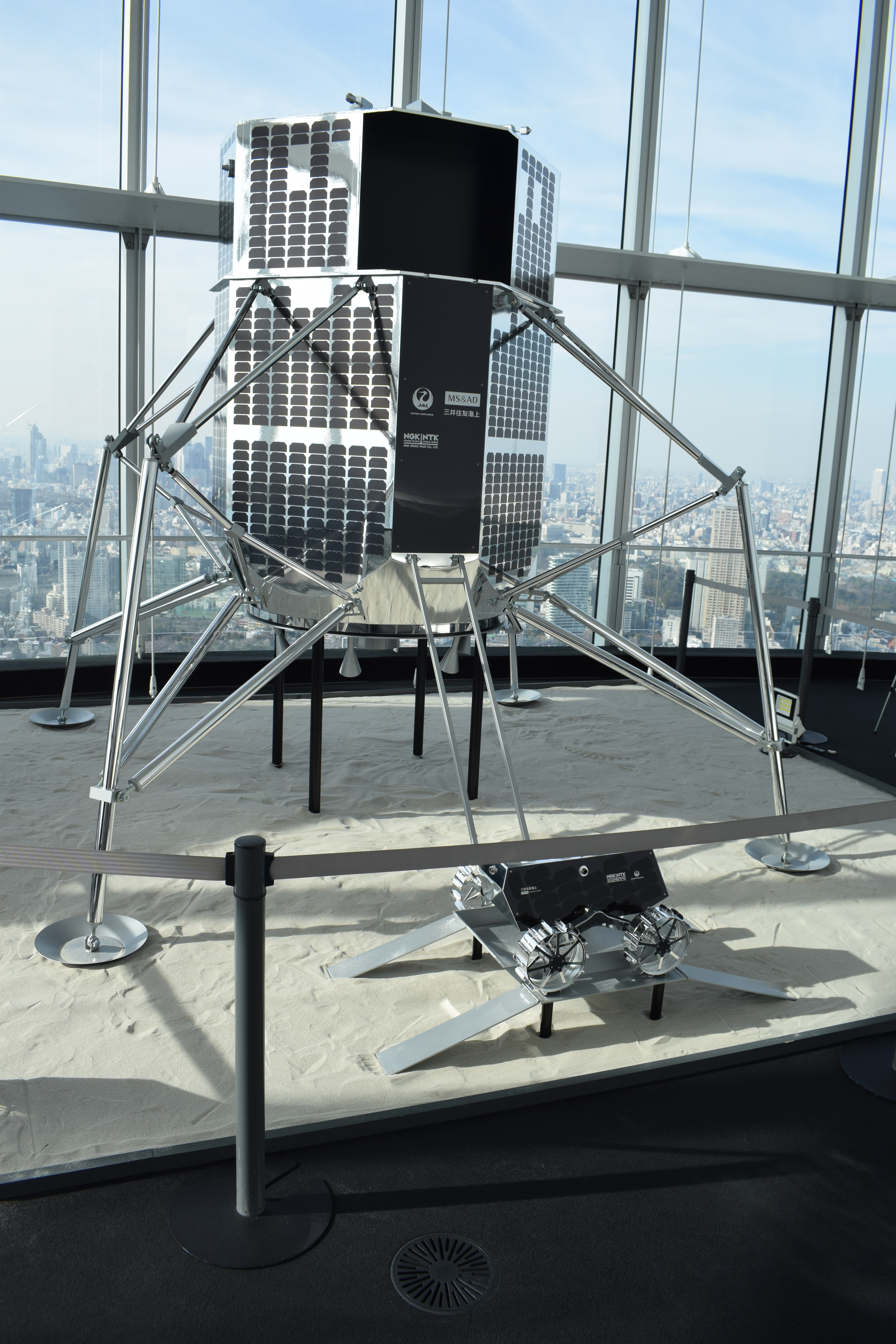
Lander model on exhibition in 2019

The team initially planned its own lunar lander but later changed plan to fly their rover on landers operated by other GLXP teams. For most of the duration of the GLXP, the Hakuto rover was planned to be deployed from Astrobotic's Peregrine lander, however for the final phase of the prize, with Astrobotic lacking a launch contract, Hakuto established a new agreement with Team Indus for launch and lunar surface delivery of the rover. That mission was to use the proven PSLV launcher of the Indian Space Research Organisation (ISRO). Team Indus was subsequently confirmed by XPRIZE Foundation to have a valid launch contract and therefore both teams were eligible to remain in the prize beyond the launch contract cut-off date of end 2016. The launch was initially scheduled for 28 December 2017, and then delayed to March 2018. However, on 9 January 2018 it was reported that ISRO had cancelled the launch contract with TeamIndus and, by extension, Hakuto.

On 23 January 2018, X Prize founder and chairman Peter Diamandis stated "After close consultation with our five finalist Google Lunar X Prize teams over the past several months, we have concluded that no team will make a launch attempt to reach the moon by the March 31, 2018, deadline... and the US$30 million Google Lunar XPRIZE will go unclaimed."

In April 2018, it was reported that the leadership (ispace Inc.) of the then former Hakuto GLXP team still planned to launch its rover in 2020 on the Astrobotic Peregrine lander mission, launching on an Atlas V rocket. That mission would have included Hakuto's Sorato rover being deployed on the lunar surface along with other smaller rovers, including Team AngelicvM's rover. The proposed landing site was Lacus Mortis.

In August 2019, ispace announced a restructuring of its lunar program, since called Hakuto-R. A significant change was the elimination of the technology demonstration orbiter mission in 2020 in favor of moving more quickly toward a demonstration of commercial lunar landing capabilities.

The Hakuto-R Mission 1 lunar lander was launched aboard a Falcon 9 Block 5 rocket on 11 December 2022, carrying the Rashid rover of the Emirates Lunar Mission and JAXA/Tomy's SORA-Q transformable lunar robot, both of which Hakuto-R will deliver to the lunar surface. It also houses a music disc featuring the song ‘SORATO’ by the Japanese rock band Sakanaction. The primary landing site is Atlas Crater and landing was scheduled for April 25, 2023 at 16:40 UTC. However, ispace lost contact with the lander just before the attempted landing. CEO Takeshi Hamada believed that the mission had failed, saying "we have to assume that we could not complete the landing on the lunar surface."

Hakuto-R Mission 2, a lunar lander and TENACIOUS rover, was launched on 15 January 2025. Landing was expected in Mare Frigoris around 6 June 2025. The mission was scheduled to land on Thursday, 5 June, at 19:17 UTC, assuming the primary landing spot in the middle of Mare Frigoris was chosen. If ispace decided to use one of the three backup landing sites, those attempts would occur on different times.

According to the live telemetry, it flipped over and died one minute before landing. The Hakuto-R Mission 2 suffered a crash landing on the surface of the Moon.

== See also ==
- Private spaceflight
- Space advertising
- X PRIZE Foundation
