= 5-hydroxyfuranocoumarin 5-O-methyltransferase =

Class of enzymes

Identifiers
- EC no.: 2.1.1.69
- CAS no.: 101637-31-4&title= 67339-12-2, 101637-31-4

Databases
- IntEnz: IntEnz view
- BRENDA: BRENDA entry
- ExPASy: NiceZyme view
- KEGG: KEGG entry
- MetaCyc: metabolic pathway
- PRIAM: profile
- PDB structures: RCSB PDB PDBe PDBsum
Search
- PMC: articles
- PubMed: articles
- NCBI: proteins

5-hydroxyfuranocoumarin 5-O-methyltransferase (EC 2.1.1.69, furanocoumarin 5-methyltransferase, furanocoumarin 5-O-methyltransferase, bergaptol 5-O-methyltransferase, bergaptol O-methyltransferase, bergaptol methyltransferase, S-adenosyl-L-methionine:bergaptol O-methyltransferase, BMT, S-adenosyl-L-methionine:5-hydroxyfuranocoumarin 5.1-O-methyltransferase) is an enzyme with systematic name S-adenosyl-L-methionine:5-hydroxyfurocoumarin 5-O-methyltransferase. This enzyme catalyses the following chemical reaction

(1) S-adenosyl-L-methionine + a 5-hydroxyfurocoumarin $\rightleftharpoons$ S-adenosyl-L-homocysteine + a 5-methoxyfurocoumarin (general reaction)

For example, bergaptol is converted to bergapten:

bergaptol
+ SAM
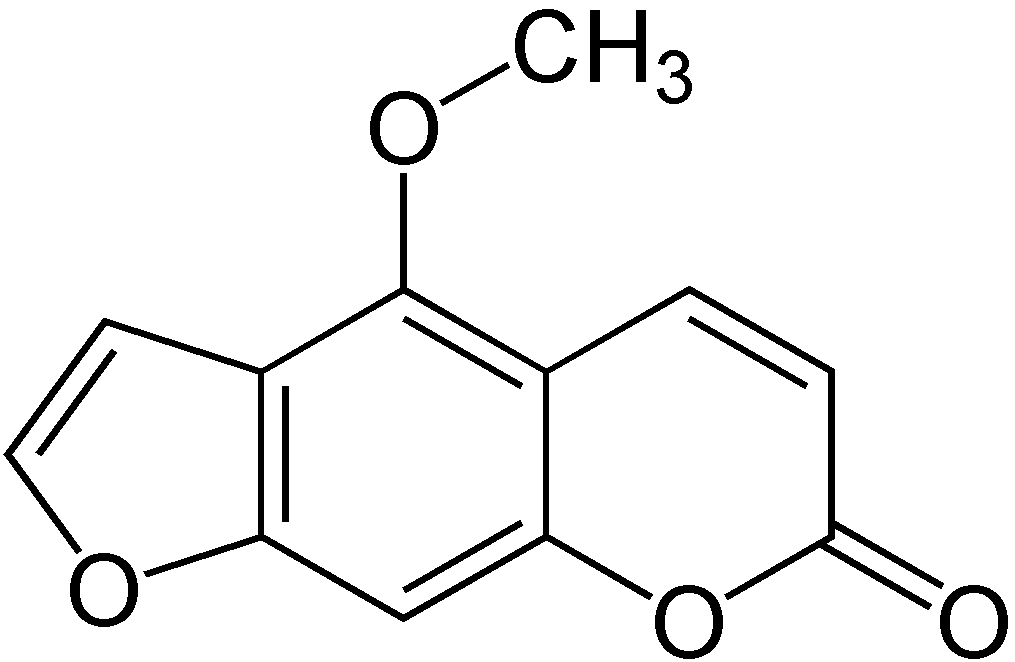
bergapten
+ SAH

These are methylation reaction in which the methyl group comes from the cofactor, S-adenosyl methionine (SAM), which becomes S-adenosyl-L-homocysteine (SAH).

The enzyme methylates the 5-hydroxy group of some other hydroxy- and methylcoumarins, giving isopimpinellin and related products.
