= Centre de Technologia Aerospacial =

The Centre Tecnològic per a la Indústria Aeronàutica i de l’Espai (CTAE, Technological Centre for the Aeronautical and Space Industry), was founded in March 2005 as a non-profit private foundation by academia, government and industry in the region of Catalonia, Spain.

CTAE is committed to boost the aeronautical and space sector in Catalonia, with a mission to enhance industrial competitiveness, stimulating innovation, and undertaking transversal initiatives involving research centers, government and companies.

CTAE offers services of Research, Development and Innovation ("R+D+i") to companies, helping transform concept into product, with the support and the competences of universities and research centers, and financing projects with a mixed formula of public-private funding.

CTAE promotes also trans-regional and international cooperation, transfer of technology with other non-aerospace sectors, as well as promotion of activities related to outreach the aerospace sector to society.
