= Japanese Lunar Exploration Program =

Program of missions to the moon by JAXA

The (Japanese) Lunar Exploration Program (Japanese: 月探査計画, romanized: tsuki tansa keikaku) is a program of robotic and human missions to the Moon undertaken by the Japanese Aerospace Exploration Agency (JAXA) and its division, the Institute of Space and Astronautical Science (ISAS). It is also one of the three major enterprises of the JAXA Space Exploration Center (JSPEC). The main goal of the program is "to elucidate the origin and evolution of the Moon and utilize the Moon in the future".

The first spacecraft of the program, the uncrewed lunar orbiter SELENE (Kaguya), was launched from Tanegashima Space Center on September 14, 2007, after being delayed several times. SELENE-2, Japan's first lunar lander and rover, was expected to be launched in the 2020s, but the mission was canceled in March 2015. The program also included a lunar sample return mission (SELENE-3) and an advanced lander for future human missions to the Moon. The eventual goal is to participate in an international lunar outpost program, in which Japanese crews would stay on the lunar surface for a prolonged period of time and promote scientific research and environment utilization.

== Past missions ==
=== Completed missions ===
==== Hiten (MUSES-A) ====
Hiten, or MUSES-A (Mu Space Engineering Satellite-A) is a technology demonstration satellite built by ISAS, launched on January 24, 1990.

==== SLIM ====
SLIM, short for Smart Lander for Investigating Moon, is a SPRINT-C (Small scientific satellite Platform for Rapid INvestigation and Test-C) mission to test lunar landing technologies. SLIM was successfully launched together with the X-Ray Imaging and Spectroscopy Mission (XRISM) space telescope from Tanegashima Space Center on 6 September 2023 at 23:42 UTC (7 September 08:42 Japan Standard Time) and is to land near Shioli crater (13.3°S, 25.2°E) via Weak stability boundary like trajectory. SLIM entered lunar orbit 25 December JST.

The lunar lander, nicknamed Moon Sniper for its extremely accurate landing precision, of about 100 metres (330 ft) landing ellipse, touched down onto the Moon on 19 January 2024 at 15:20 UTC, at the Sea of Nectar, to the south of the Theophilus crater. Japan became the fifth nation to successfully soft land an operational lander on the Moon, after the USA, USSR, China, and India.

Though it landed successfully, it was in the wrong attitude, because the solar panels were oriented westwards facing opposite to the Sun at the start of lunar day, thereby failing to generate enough power. The lander operated on internal battery power, which was fully drained that day. The mission's operators hope that the lander will wake up after a few days when sunlight should hit the solar panels. A Mitsubishi Heavy H2A rocket was used to launch the SLIM, which initially entered the lunar orbit on December 23, 2023.

Irrespective of this solar array issue on lander, the two LEV 1 and 2 rovers, deployed during hovering just before final landing are working as expected and LEV-1 communicating independently to the ground stations. LEV-1 conducted six hops on lunar surface. Images taken by LEV-2 show the wrong attitude landing with loss of an engine nozzle during descent and even possible sustained damage to lander's Earth bound antenna, that is not pointed towards Earth. Irrespective of wrong attitude and loss of communication with the lander, the mission is already fully successful after confirmation of its primary goal landing within 100 m (330 ft) of its landing spot was already achieved.

On 29 January, the lander resumed operations after being shut for a week. JAXA said it re-established contact with the lander and its solar cells were working again after a shift in lighting conditions allowed it to catch sunlight. After that, SLIM was put in sleep mode for impending harsh lunar night. SLIM was expected to operate only for one lunar daylight period, or 14 Earth days, and the on-board electronics were not designed to withstand the −120 °C (−184 °F) nighttime temperatures on the Moon. On 25 February 2024, JAXA sent wake-up calls and found SLIM had successfully survived the night on the lunar surface while maintaining communication capabilities. Since it was midday of the lunar day on the moon om 25 February 2024, the temperature of the communications payload was extremely high, so communication was terminated after only a short period of time. JAXA is now preparing for resumed operations, once the temperature has fallen sufficiently. This feat of surviving lunar night without a Radioisotope heater unit is only achieved by some landers in Surveyor Program. SLIM showed perseverance and survived another lunar night waking up on 28 March 2024.

On 27 March 2024, SLIM survived its second lunar night and woke up sending more images back to Earth, showing "perseverance." Jaxa said "According to the acquired data, some temperature sensors and unused battery cells are starting to malfunction, but the majority of functions that survived the first lunar night was maintained even after the second lunar night."

On 24 April 2024, it survived its third lunar night and woke up sending more images back to Earth. This demonstration mission is estimated to cost about ¥15 billion (US$125 million).

==== SELENE (Kaguya) ====
SELENE (Selenological and Engineering Explorer), nicknamed Kaguya after a lunar princess in the ancient Japanese folklore The Tale of the Bamboo Cutter, is the second Japanese mission to the Moon. Launched in September 2007, it was "the largest lunar mission since the Apollo program". The mission featured three separate space craft, the main orbiter (Kaguya), the small relay satellite (Okina), and the VLBI satellite (Ouna).

==== EQUULEUS ====
EQUULEUS (EQUilibriUm Lunar-Earth point 6U Spacecraft) was a nanosatellite of the 6U CubeSat format that measured the distribution of plasma that surrounds the Earth (plasmasphere) to help scientists understand the radiation environment in that region. It also demonstrated low-thrust trajectory control techniques, such as multiple lunar flybys, within the Earth-Moon region using water steam as propellant. The spacecraft was designed and developed jointly by the Japan Aerospace Exploration Agency (JAXA) and the University of Tokyo.

EQUULEUS was one of ten CubeSats launched with the Artemis 1 mission into a heliocentric orbit in cislunar space on the maiden flight of the Space Launch System that took place on 16 November 2022. On 17 November 2022, Japan Aerospace Exploration Agency (JAXA) reported that EQUULEUS separated successfully on 16 November 2022 and was confirmed to be operating normally on 16 November 2022 at 13:50 UTC. EQUULEUS filmed the Green Comet C/2022 E3 (ZTF) in February 2023 and operated till end of its mission in May 2023.

=== Cancelled missions ===
==== LUNAR-A ====
LUNAR-A was an ISAS mission consisting of a lunar space craft which would have carried two penetrators to the Moon, and deploy them at an altitude of 40 km on opposite sides of the lunar body. The penetrators were to have been braked by a small rocket at an altitude of 25 km, then free fall to the surface. They were designed to withstand a collision speed of 330 meters per second to deeply penetrate the lunar regolith. Once the penetrators are deployed, the LUNAR-A spacecraft was mission-planned to maneuver to an orbital altitude of 200 km above the lunar surface. The craft was to have carried a monochromatic imaging camera with a resolution of 30 m. It was to be Japan's first large scale lunar probe. (Hiten was a technology demonstrator and only had a camera and a dust counter)

Not only was LUNAR-A one of the first two missions of the original Lunar Exploration Program, it was supposed to be the first mission in the LUNAR series. However, the mission was delayed for years (the original launch date was in 1995), and from 2004, no launch date was set. The space craft was completed in 1997, but the development of the penetrators were severely delayed. The Project faced several other issues, including problems with the propellant and the thrusters. Worse, in 2006, JAXA decided to retire the M-V rocket, which the LUNAR-A planned to use. M-V-2, the rocket which was to be used for LUNAR-A couldn't be used anymore, because many portions of it were reused for other launches. The M-V-2 is now displayed in JAXA's Sagamihara Campus.

In January 2007, JAXA cancelled the LUNAR-A mission, mostly due to the fact that the space craft had become old. A follow-on mission known as LUNAR-B existed, but was merged into the SELENE series following LUNAR-A's cancellation. JAXA continued the research for the penetrators, and completed its development in October 2010, following a successful test fire. Russia's Luna-Glob1 plans to use four penetrators provided by JAXA. JAXA is also considering to have the SELENE-2 carry penetrators. Britain's BNSC once stated that they were interested in acquiring several Japanese penetrators for their MoonLITE probe.

==== SELENE-2 ====
SELENE-2, also known as Kaguya-2, formerly known as SELENE-B, would have been the follow-on mission to Kaguya. SELENE-2 would have consisted of one large lander, which would have a small-sized rover, and if possible, would also have some penetrators inherited from the LUNAR-A mission, and a small data relay satellite. In March 2015, JAXA cancelled the SELENE-2 mission.

=== Failed missions ===
==== Hakuto-R Mission 1 ====
Hakuto-R Mission 1 was a failed private uncrewed lunar landing mission built and operated by the Japanese company ispace, which was launched in December 2022 for an attempted lunar landing in April 2023.

This first mission of the Hakuto-R program was primarily a technology demonstrator and carried the Emirates Lunar Mission. Travelling approximately 1,400,000 kilometres (870,000 mi), it is the furthest a privately funded spacecraft has traveled. Communication with the lander was lost during the final seconds of its April 2023 descent.

The project began with engineer Andrew Barton in 2008, who sought to win the Google Lunar X Prize by landing a privately funded rover on the Moon, and gathered an international group of professionals to create White Label Space. Takeshi Hakamada found ispace in 2010 as a Japanese branch of White Label Space. Many of the professionals abandoned the project by 2013, though a group of Japanese members sought to continue with the project, which was renamed from White Label Space to Hakuto, based on the white Hare of Inaba in Japanese mythology. By 2017, ispace had secured $90 million in funding and though no teams in the Google Lunar X Prize ever launched before the 2018 deadline, the Hakuto team would continue. In April 2022, ispace was placed on the Tokyo Stock Exchange, receiving a 65% increase in its share price within two weeks.

==== OMOTENASHI ====
OMOTENASHI (Outstanding MOon exploration TEchnologies demonstrated by NAno Semi-Hard Impactor) was a small spacecraft and semi-hard lander of the 6U CubeSat format intended to demonstrate low-cost technology to land and explore the lunar surface. The CubeSat was to take measurements of the radiation environment near the Moon as well as on the lunar surface. Omotenashi is a Japanese word for "welcome" or "Hospitality".

OMOTENASHI was one of ten CubeSats launched with the Artemis 1 mission into a heliocentric orbit in cislunar space on the maiden flight of the Space Launch System (SLS), that took place on 16 November 2022.

After deployment from the Artemis I second stage, JAXA reported unstable communications with the spacecraft. On 21 November 2022, a Twitter message sent by JAXA reported that further attempts to communicate with the lander, which was scheduled to begin its landing sequences that day, had been ended.

==== Hakuto-R Mission 2 ====
The second mission of the Hakuto-R program by ispace, Hakuto-R Mission 2, carrying the RESILIENCE lunar lander and TENACIOUS micro rover, was launched on 15 January 2025 on a Falcon 9 launch vehicle with Blue Ghost M1 lander. Landing was expected in Mare Frigoris around 6 June 2025. The mission was scheduled to land on Thursday, 5 June, at 19:17 UTC, assuming the primary landing spot in the middle of Mare Frigoris was chosen. If ispace decided to use one of the three backup landing sites, those attempts would occur on different times.

According to the live telemetry, it flipped over and died one minute before landing.

==== Yaoki rover ====
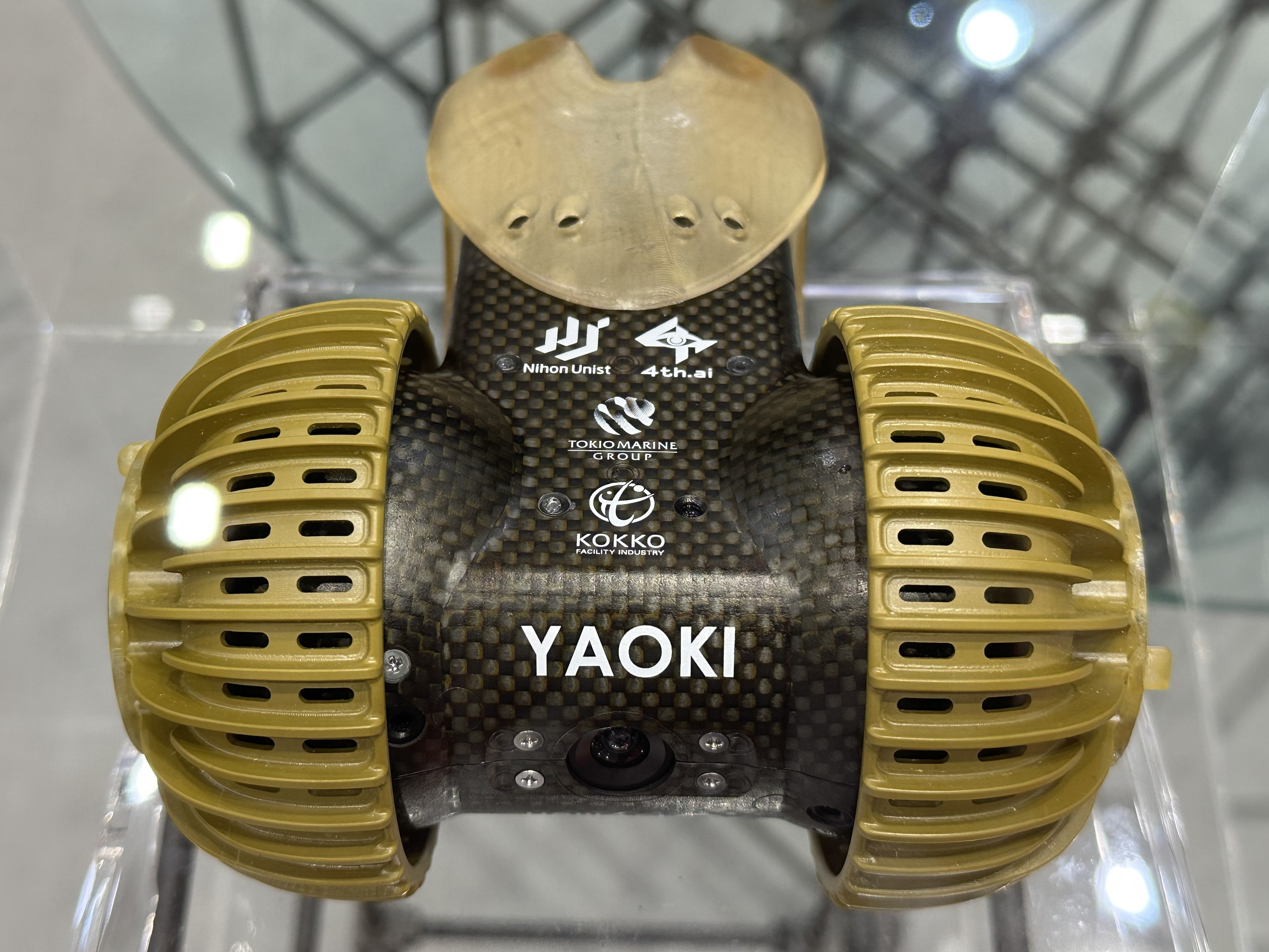
Yaoki rover at Japan International Aerospace Exhibition 2024 (19 October 2024)

Yaoki is a Moon rover made by Japanese company Dymon and launched on IM-2 mission on 27 February 2025 and it's lander tilted on landing on 6 March 2025, so the mission ended before recharging and deployment of payloads. It weighs 498 grams.

== Future missions ==
=== Planned missions ===
==== Lunar Cruiser ====
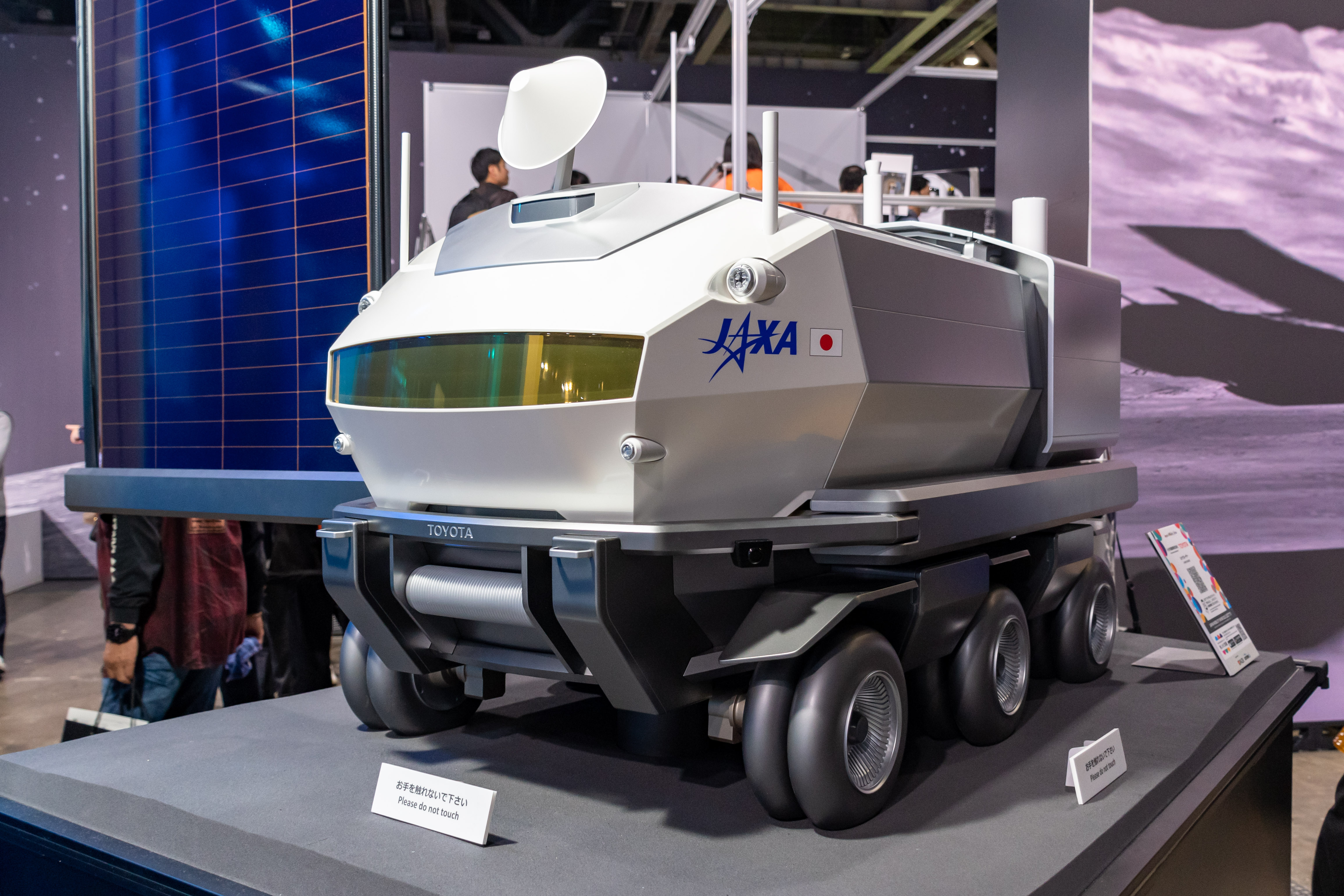
Luna Cruiser at Japan Mobility Show 2023

The Lunar Cruiser is a crewed pressurized rover being developed jointly by JAXA and Toyota that astronauts can drive on the Moon. The Lunar Cruiser is being developed as a part of NASA's Artemis Program and will enable astronaut crews to take trips across the Moon lasting up to 45 days. Named after the Toyota Land Cruiser, its name was chosen "because of the familiar feeling it offers the people involved in the development and manufacture of the vehicle prototype as part of the joint research project as well as the familiarity it will provide the general public." The rover is currently being manufactured, with an expected launch date in the latter half of the 2020s. The rover itself will use fuel-cell electric-vehicle technologies.

==== LUPEX ====
The Lunar Polar Exploration Mission (LUPEX) is a planned joint lunar mission by the Indian Space Research Organisation (ISRO) and the Japan Aerospace Exploration Agency (JAXA). The mission would send an uncrewed lunar lander and rover to explore the south pole region of the Moon no earlier than 2028. JAXA is likely to provide the under-development H3 launch vehicle and the rover, while ISRO would be providing the lander.

==== Yaoki ====
Yaoki is a lunar rover made by the Japanese company Dymon to be launched in 2023 by the American company Astrobotic Technology on their Peregrine lunar lander. Yaoki was first announced in 2019.

Yaoki weighs 498g and transportation to the Moon costs $1.2 million per kilogram.

=== Proposed missions ===
==== SELENE-X ====
SELENE-X would have been launched in the late 2010s, in view of Japan's participation in Humans Lunar Activities foreseen. The SELENE-X may perform either of the following demonstrations:

- Option-1:Technology demonstration for building outposts such as the excavation for construction of Infrastructures.
- Option-2: Logistics capability demonstration for building common landers for both transportation and JAXA's own robotic missions.
- Option-3: Highly sophisticated in-situ robotic lander, or returning samples of the surface soil to the Earth, including the development of high speed reentry capsules.

There are other options under study, and will be determined after the international exploration strategy has been clarified.

== See also ==
- Exploration of the Moon and Robotic exploration of the Moon
- List of missions to the Moon
- Lunar Gateway
