= Rashid 1 =

United Arab Emirates lunar rover mission

- Mission type: Lunar rover
- Website: Lunar Mission
- Mission duration: 0 days (landing failure)

Spacecraft properties
- Spacecraft: Rashid
- Manufacturer: MBRSC
- Dry mass: 10 kg (22 lb)
- Dimensions: 53.5 cm (21.1 in) × 53.85 cm (21.20 in)

Start of mission
- Launch date: 11 December 2022, 07:38:13 UTC
- Rocket: Falcon 9 Block 5
- Launch site: Cape Canaveral SLC-40
- Contractor: SpaceX
- Deployed from: ispace Hakuto-R

End of mission
- Last contact: 20 April 2023
- Landing date: 25 April 2023, 16:40 UTC (Destroyed on impact)
- Landing site: Atlas crater (attempted). 47.581°N 44.094°E

Lunar rover
- Landing date: April 25, 2023 (crashed)
- Landing site: Atlas Crater (planned/crashed)
- Emirates Planetary Programme Emirates Lunar Mission

Rashid 1 was the first mission to the Moon from the United Arab Emirates. The Emirates Lunar Mission by Mohammed bin Rashid Space Centre (MBRSC) sent a lunar rover to the Moon aboard ispace's Hakuto-R Mission 1 lander. It was launched on 11 December 2022 on a Falcon 9 Block 5 rocket, and the rover attempted to land in Atlas crater. On 25 April 2023, seconds before an attempted landing, communication with the Hakuto-R lander was lost. The ispace team confirmed that the spacecraft had crashed into the Moon and was thus destroyed.

== Overview ==
Rashid 1 was equipped with two high-resolution cameras, a microscopic camera to capture small details, and a thermal imaging camera. The rover also carried a Langmuir probe, designed to study the Moon's plasma and attempt to explain why Moon dust is so sticky. The rover was designed to study the lunar surface, mobility on the Moon's surface and how different surfaces interact with lunar particles.

The mission's initial timeline was to send the rover by 2024. On 14 April 2021, MBRSC announced that the schedule had been moved up to send the rover to the Moon by 2022, rather than 2024. The rover is named Rashid in honor of Dubai's late ruler Sheikh Rashid bin Saeed Al Maktoum. The rover was built in MBRSC in Dubai by Emiratis, making it the first Arab country to send a mission to the Moon.

As the United Arab Emirates did not plan to build its own lander, it contracted with the Japanese company ispace for a lunar landing. The Emirates Lunar Mission was the first Moon trip for Hakuto-R, which ispace was developing for more than a decade. The company, which was established in 2010, managed Team Hakuto, one of the five finalists in the Google Lunar X Prize. The private race to the Moon ended in 2018 without a winner.
