= Smart Lander for Investigating Moon =

Japanese lunar lander (2023–2024)

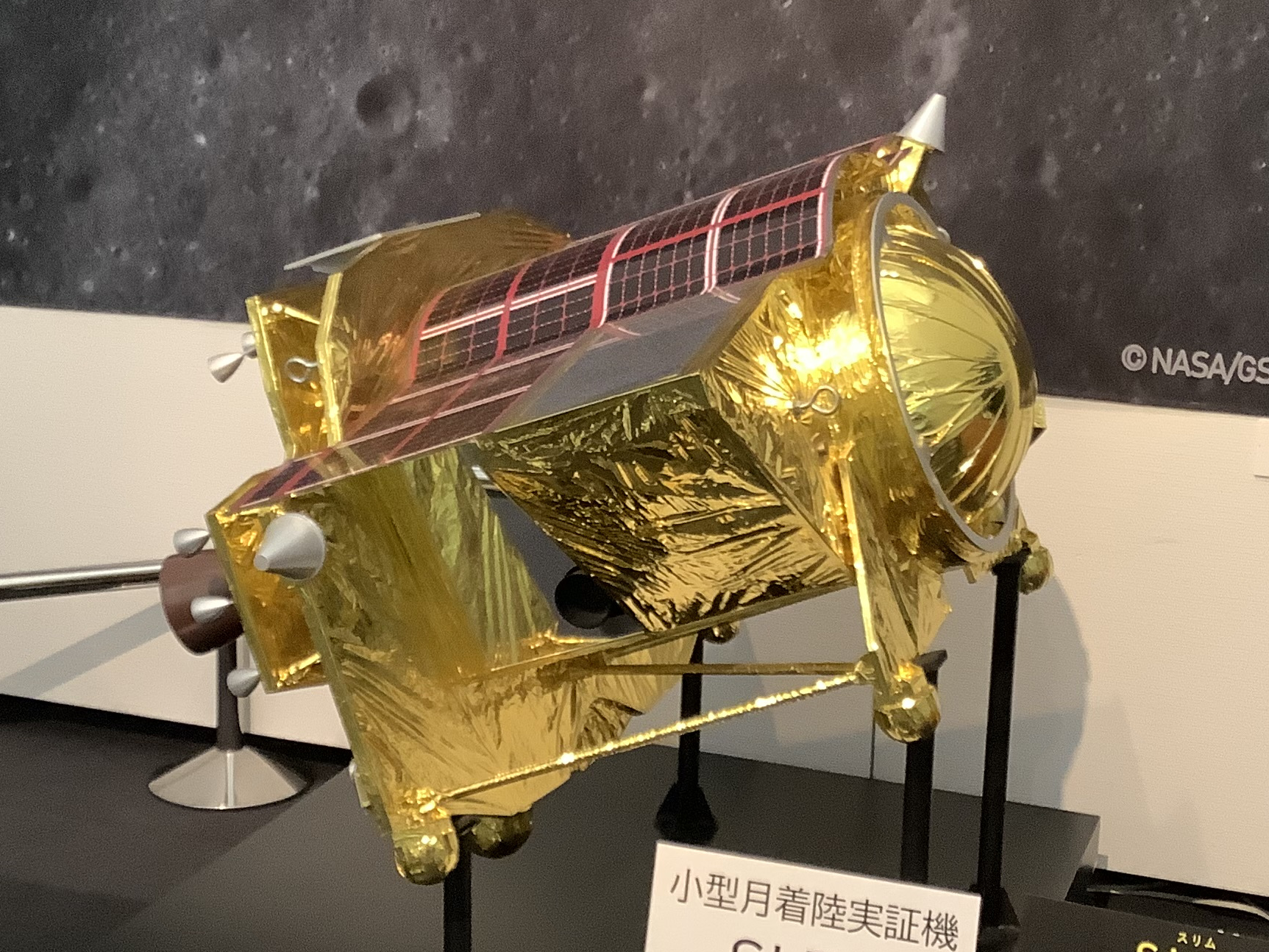
- Half-scale model of SLIM in landing configuration
- Names: SLIM; Moon Sniper
- Mission type: Lunar lander/rover
- Operator: JAXA
- COSPAR ID: 2023-137D
- SATCAT no.: 57803
- Website: Official website
- Mission duration: Total: 7 months, 23 days Surface operations: 3 months, 10 days

Spacecraft properties
- Manufacturer: Mitsubishi Electric
- Launch mass: 590 kg (1,300 lb)
- Dry mass: 120 kg (260 lb)
- Dimensions: 1.5 × 1.5 × 2 m (4.9 × 4.9 × 6.6 ft)

Start of mission
- Launch date: 6 September 2023 23:42:11 UTC
- Rocket: H-IIA 202
- Launch site: Tanegashima, LA-Y1
- Contractor: Mitsubishi Heavy Industries

End of mission
- Declared: 23 August 2024, 13:40
- Last contact: 29 April 2024

Lunar orbiter
- Orbital insertion: 25 December 2023 07:51 UTC

Lunar lander
- Landing date: 19 January 2024 15:20:00 UTC
- Landing site: near Shioli crater 13.3160°S 25.2510°E

The Smart Lander for Investigating Moon (SLIM), nicknamed the "Moon Sniper", was a lunar lander mission operated by the Japan Aerospace Exploration Agency (JAXA). Manufactured by Mitsubishi Electric, it was launched on September 6, 2023, aboard an H-IIA rocket from the Tanegashima Space Center, together with the X-Ray Imaging and Spectroscopy Mission (XRISM) space telescope. SLIM entered lunar orbit on December 25, 2023, and successfully soft-landed on the Moon on January 19, 2024, making Japan the fifth country to accomplish a soft landing on the Moon, after the Soviet Union, the United States, China, and India.

SLIM's primary objective was to demonstrate precision lunar landing technology. Using facial recognition-derived image processing to identify lunar craters and data from the SELENE orbiter for navigation, it aimed to land within 100 m (330 ft) of its designated target near Shioli crater in the Sea of Nectar—a level of accuracy far exceeding that of earlier missions. Although the landing was successful, the spacecraft came to rest on its side, leaving its solar panels oriented away from the Sun and limiting initial power generation. After a brief period of battery-powered operation, SLIM was powered down on January 20, 2024 (JST), only to be revived nine days later when the sunlight shifted to its panels.

SLIM carried two small lunar rovers: LEV-1, a hopping rover with direct-to-Earth communication capability, and LEV-2 (Sora-Q), a baseball-sized rover jointly developed with Tomy, Sony, and Doshisha University. Both were successfully deployed during descent. Although SLIM was not designed to survive the extreme cold of lunar night, it did so repeatedly, waking up for a total of four lunar days before going silent in late May 2024. JAXA officially declared the mission concluded on August 23, 2024. In doing so, SLIM set a world record for longevity among lunar surface spacecraft lacking a radioisotope thermoelectric generator (RTG).

== Background ==
The main purpose of Japan's first lunar surface mission was to demonstrate precision lunar landing. During its descent, the lander recognized lunar craters by applying technology from facial recognition systems, and determined its current location from observation data collected by the SELENE (Kaguya) lunar orbiter mission. SLIM aimed to perform a soft landing with an accuracy range of 100 m (330 ft). In comparison, the accuracy of the 1969 piloted Apollo 11 Lunar Module Eagle was an ellipse which was 20 km (12 mi) long in downrange and 5 km (3.1 mi) wide in crossrange.

According to Yoshifumi Inatani, deputy director general of the JAXA Institute of Space and Astronautical Science (ISAS), succeeding in this extremely precise landing will lead to enhanced quality of space exploration. The expected cost for developing this project is 18 billion yen, or US$121.5 million.

== History ==
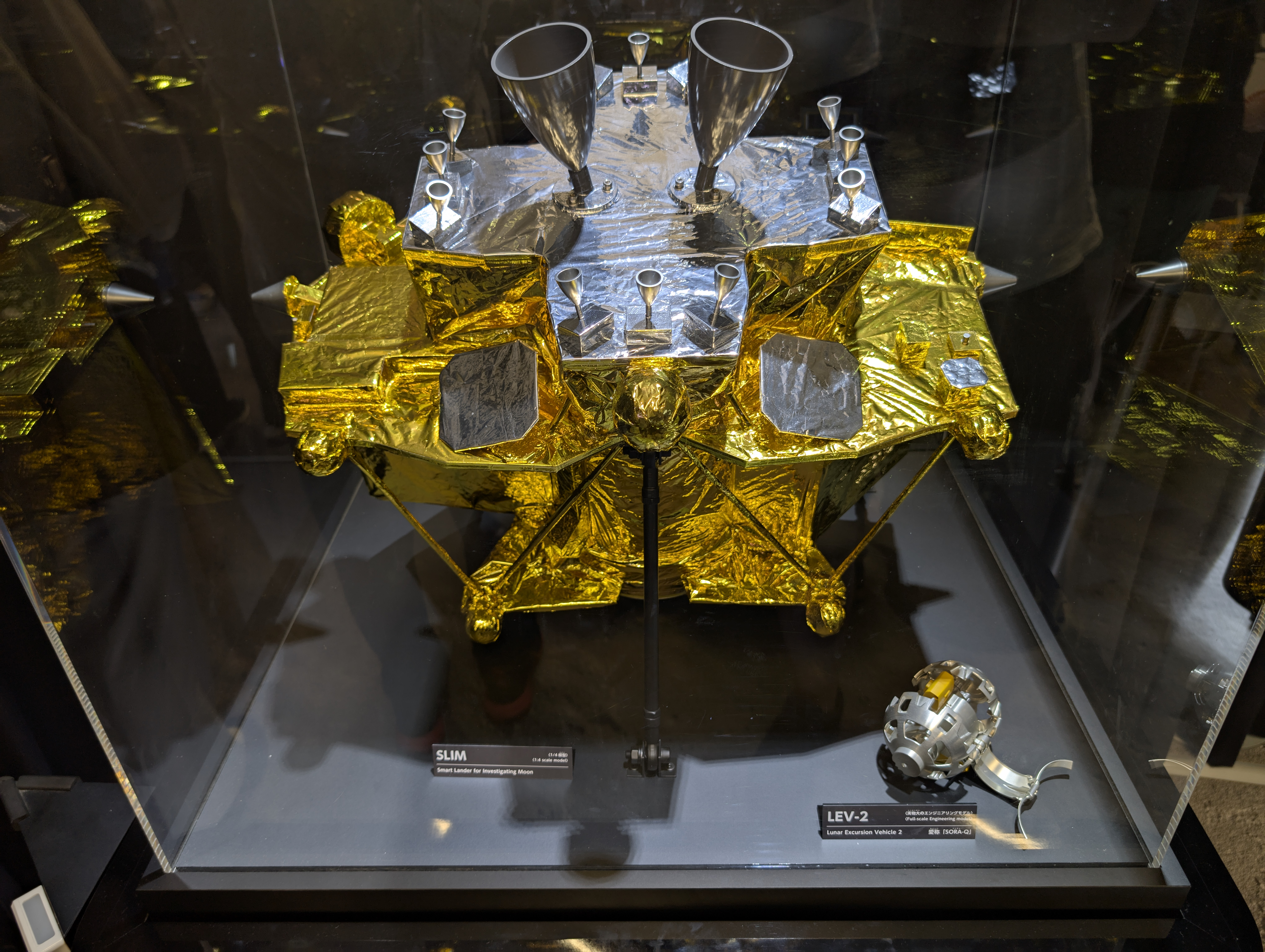
Scale model of SLIM and Sora-Q rover at Expo 2025

The proposal came to be known as the Small Lunar Landing Experiment Satellite (小型月着陸実験衛星) (SLIM). On 27 December 2013, ISAS called for proposals for its next "Competitively-Chosen Medium-Sized Focused Mission", and SLIM was among the seven proposals submitted. In June 2014, SLIM passed the semi-final selection along with the DESTINY+ technology demonstration mission, and in February 2015, SLIM was ultimately selected. From April 2016, SLIM gained project status within JAXA. In May 2016, Mitsubishi Electric (MELCO) was awarded the contract for building the spacecraft.

SLIM was not the first Japanese lunar lander built for operation on the Moon's surface; on 27 May 2016 NASA announced that the OMOTENASHI (Outstanding Moon exploration Technologies demonstrated by Nano Semi-Hard Impactor) CubeSat lander jointly developed by JAXA and the University of Tokyo was to be launched as a secondary payload on Space Launch System (SLS) Artemis 1. OMOTENASHI was meant to deploy a mini lunar lander weighing 1 kg (2.2 lb); however, on 21 November 2022, JAXA announced that attempts to communicate with the spacecraft had ceased, because the solar cells failed to generate power when facing away from the Sun. They did not face the Sun again until March 2023.

In 2017, funding difficulties for developing XRISM led to SLIM's launch being switched from its own dedicated Epsilon flight to a rideshare H-IIA flight. The resulting cost savings will be transferred to develop other satellites that are behind schedule due to XRISM.

== Rovers ==
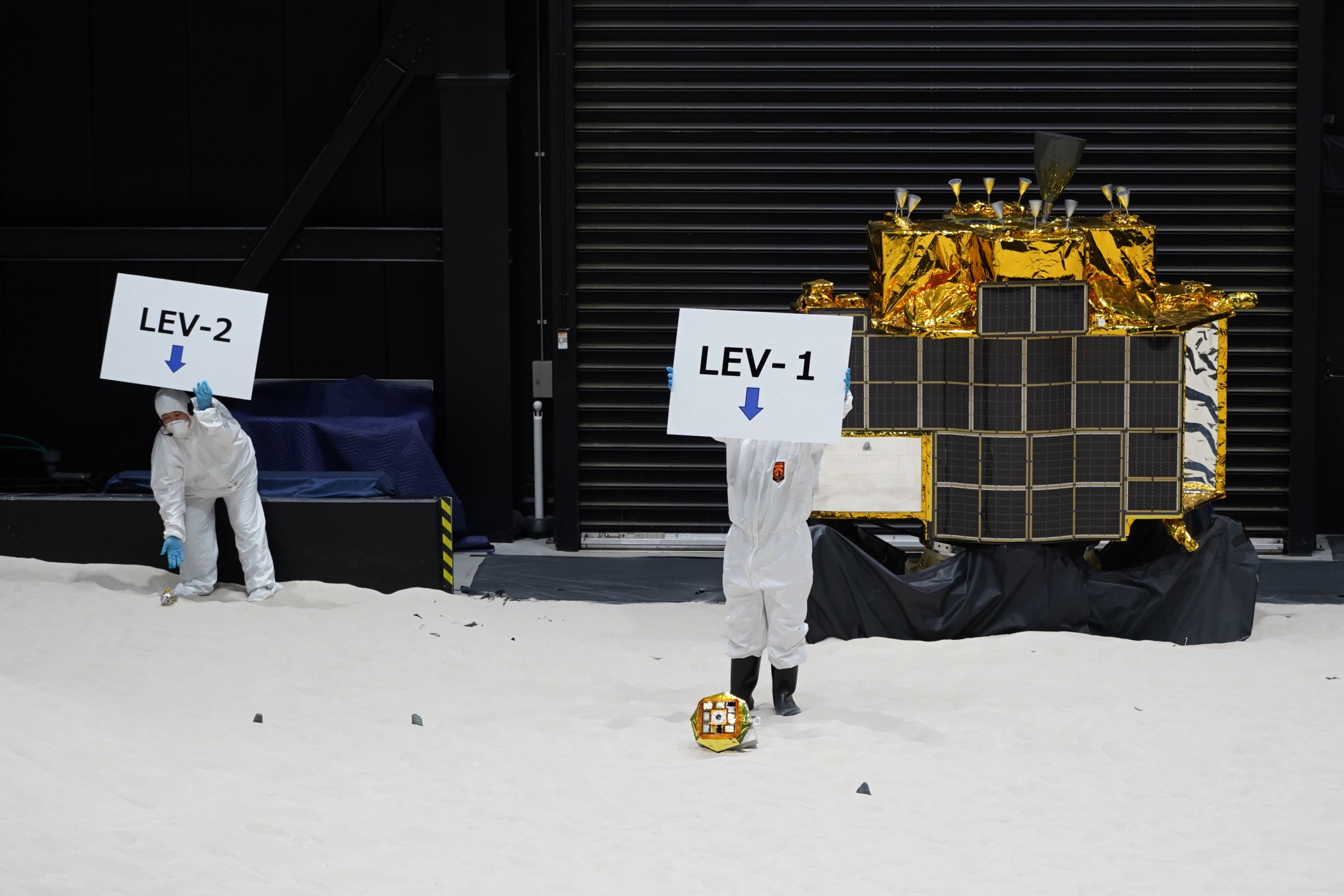
The SLIM lander with LEV-1 and LEV-2 (Sora-Q) rovers

LEV-1
- Mission type: Lunar rover
- COSPAR ID: 2023-137D
- SATCAT no.: 57803

Start of mission
- Launch date: 6 September 2023 23:42:11 UTC.
- Rocket: H-IIA 202
- Launch site: Tanegashima, LA-Y1
- Deployed from: SLIM

Moon rover
- Landing date: January 2025
- Landing site: near Shioli crater

=== Lunar Excursion Vehicle 1 ===
Lunar Excursion Vehicle 1 (LEV-1) is a lunar rover which moves by hopping. It has its own direct-to-Earth communication equipment, two wide-angle visible light cameras, and electrical components and UHF band antennas courtesy of the MINERVA and OMOTENASHI projects.

Science payloads:

- Thermometer
- Radiation monitor
- Inclinometer

=== Lunar Excursion Vehicle 2 ===
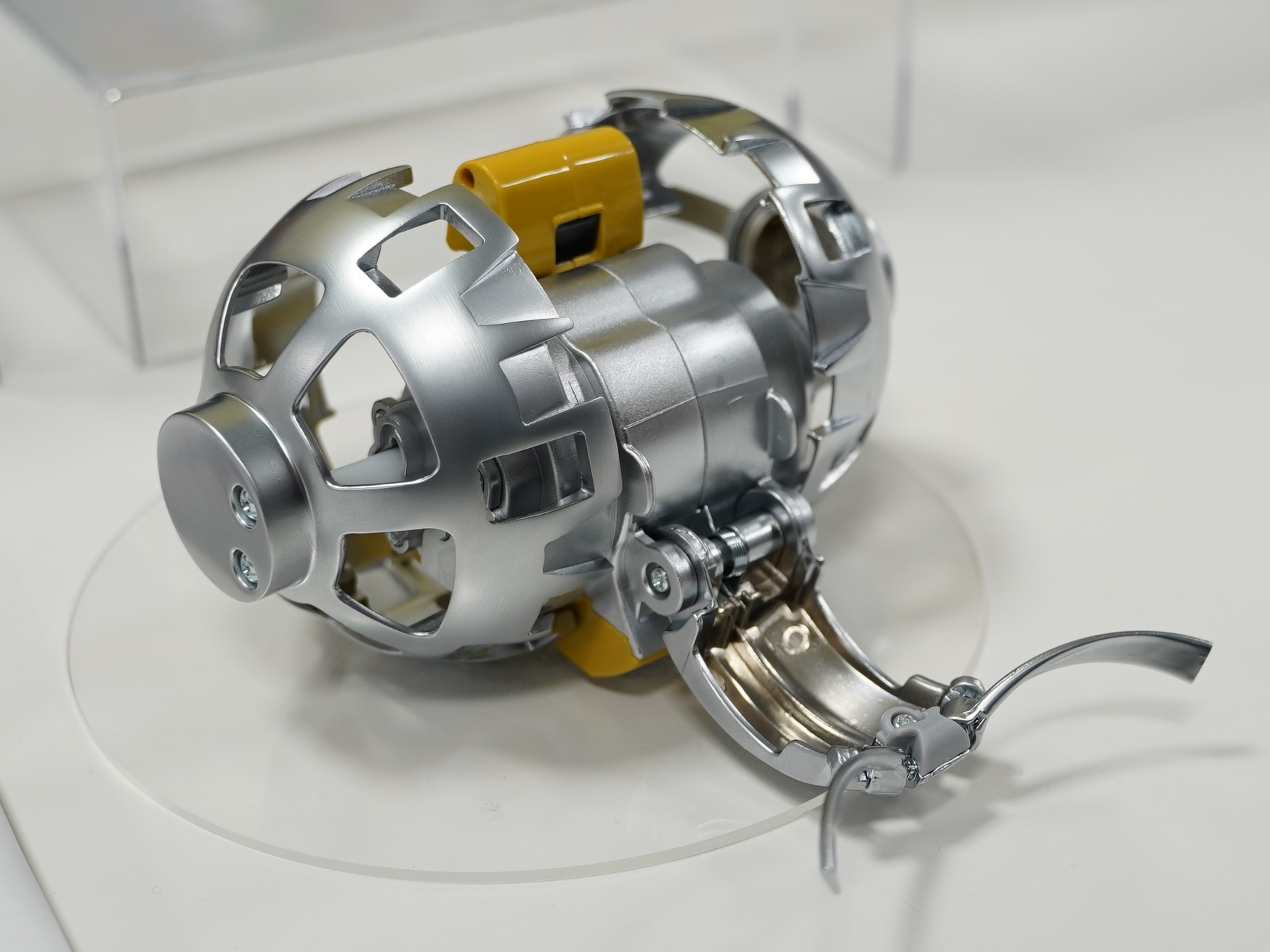
Sora-Q back view

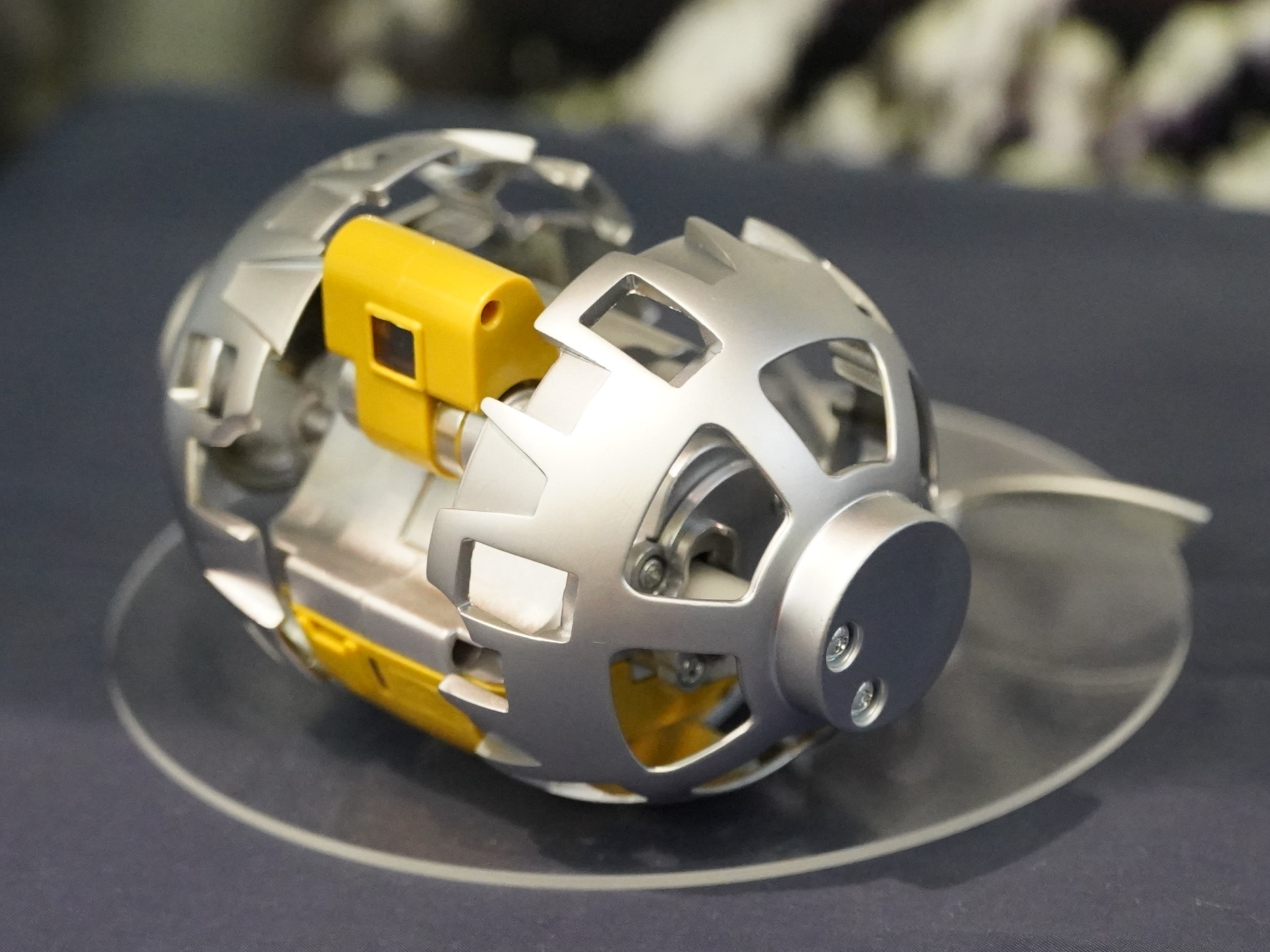
Front view

LEV-2
- Mission type: Lunar rover
- COSPAR ID: 2023-137D
- SATCAT no.: 57803

Spacecraft properties
- Landing mass: 250 g
- Dimensions: 8 cm

Start of mission
- Launch date: 6 September 2023 23:42:11 UTC
- Rocket: H-IIA 202
- Launch site: Tanegashima, LA-Y1
- Deployed from: SLIM

Moon rover
- Landing date: January 2025
- Landing site: near Shioli crater

External media

Images
- Photo of SLIM taken from LEV-2 after landing

Video
- Image of the lunar surface taken from SLIM during landing

Lunar Excursion Vehicle 2 (LEV-2) or Sora-Q, is a tiny rover developed by JAXA in cooperation with the toy company Tomy, Sony, and Doshisha University. The baseball-sized rover has a mass of 250 g and is equipped with two small cameras. LEV-2 extends its shape to crawl on the lunar surface using two wheels at its sides, a method of locomotion inspired by frogs and sea turtles; it can "run" for approximately two hours. It is the second rover of its kind to attempt operations on the lunar surface; the first was on Hakuto-R Mission 1, which crashed before it could be deployed.

== Mission ==
SLIM was successfully launched together with the X-Ray Imaging and Spectroscopy Mission (XRISM) space telescope on 6 September 2023 at 23:42 UTC (7 September 08:42 Japan Standard Time) planning to land near Shioli crater (13.3°S, 25.2°E) via weak stability boundary-like trajectory. SLIM entered lunar orbit 25 December JST.

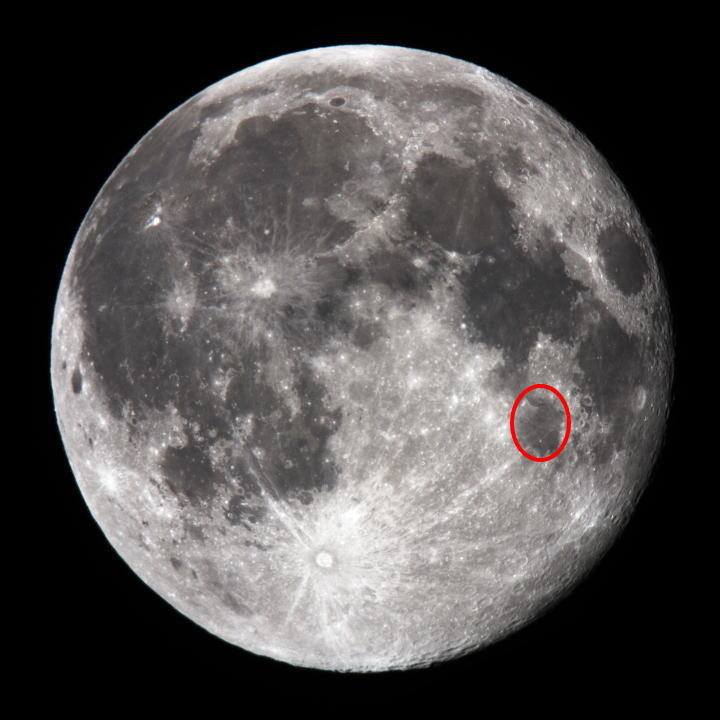
The lander touched down at the Sea of Nectar (circled).

The lunar lander, nicknamed Moon Sniper for its extremely accurate landing precision within the projected 100 m (330 ft) long landing ellipse, touched down onto the Moon on 19 January 2024 at 15:20 UTC, on the west side of the Nectaris basin (Sea of Nectar), within Cyrillus crater, and close to a small crater called Shioli. Japan thus became the fifth nation to successfully soft land an operational spacecraft on the Moon, after the Soviet Union, United States, China, and India.

Although SLIM landed successfully, it landed on its side with the solar panels oriented westwards, facing opposite the Sun at the start of the lunar day, thereby failing to generate enough power. The lander was able to operate on internal battery power for a short period of time, but was manually powered down on 19 January 2024 at 17:57 UTC (20 January 02:57 Japan Standard Time) to prevent over-discharge of the battery.

The two lunar rovers, deployed while the lander was hovering just before it touched down, worked as planned, with LEV-1 communicating independently to ground stations. LEV-1 conducted seven hops over 107 minutes on the lunar surface. Images autonomously taken by Sora-Q (a capability it shares with its sister rover) showed the SLIM had landed at a 90-degree angle, effectively on its nose, and there had been the loss of an engine nozzle during descent and even possible damage to its Earth-oriented antenna. Irrespective of wrong attitude and loss of communication with the lander, the mission is already successful, having confirmed its primary goal: landing within 100 m (330 ft) of its landing spot. JAXA gave itself 60 out of 100 for the landing.

After the shutdown on 19 January 2024, the mission's operators still hoped that the lander would wake up in a few days when the Sun would be correctly oriented so sunlight would hit the now askew solar panels. The two rovers, LEV-1 and Sora-Q, continued to operate autonomously as planned. On 25 January, JAXA announced that the LEV-1 rover had completed its planned operational period on the lunar surface, depleted its designated power, and was in a standby state on the lunar surface. While the capability to resume activity exists contingent on solar power generation from changes in the direction of the Sun, efforts will be maintained to continue receiving signals from LEV-1.

Summary of operations
Lunar day	Start (JST)	Interval (day)	End (JST)	Moon phase (Note: Days from the New Moon. '15' means the Full Moon.)	Duration (day)	Remarks
1st	Jan 20	-	Jan 20	9	1	Landing
1st	Jan 28	8	Jan 31	17–20	4	Wake up
2nd	Feb 25	28	Mar 01	16–21	6	Wake up
3rd	Mar 27	31	Mar 30	17–20	4	Wake up
4th	Apr 23	27	Apr 29	14–20	7	Wake up
5th	May 24	31	May 28	16–20	5	No response
6th	June 21	28	June 27	14–20	7	No response

On 28 January, the lander resumed operations after being shut for a week. JAXA said it re-established contact with the lander, and its solar cells were working again after a shift in lighting conditions allowed it to catch sunlight. After that, SLIM was put in sleep mode for the impending harsh lunar night. SLIM was expected to operate only for one lunar daylight period, or 14 Earth days, and the on-board electronics were not designed to withstand the −120 °C (−184 °F) nighttime temperatures on the Moon.

=== Second lunar day ===
On 25 February 2024, JAXA sent wake-up calls and found SLIM had successfully survived the night on the lunar surface while maintaining communication capabilities.

Since it was midday of the lunar day on 25 February 2024, the temperature of the communications payload was extremely high, so communication was terminated after only a short period of time. JAXA was preparing for resumed operations once the temperature had fallen sufficiently. This feat of surviving the lunar night without a radioisotope heater unit had previously been achieved only by some landers in the Surveyor Program.

=== Third lunar day ===
On 27 March 2024, SLIM survived its second lunar night and woke up, sending more images back to Earth, showing "perseverance." JAXA said: "According to the acquired data, some temperature sensors and unused battery cells are starting to malfunction, but the majority of functions that survived the first lunar night were maintained even after the second lunar night."

SLIM completed its second overnight operation in the early hours of March 30th, and went dormant again.

=== Fourth lunar day ===
On 23 April 2024, it survived its third lunar night and woke up sending more images back to Earth. JAXA said on the social media platform X that SLIM's key functions were still working despite repeated harsh cycles of temperature changes.

The Agency stated that they "plan to attempt to resume operation again in mid to late May, when SLIM's solar cells start generating electricity."

=== Fifth lunar day ===
JAXA sent commands for recovery on 24 and 25 May, when it was assumed that power had been restored, but the radio waves from SLIM could not be confirmed. JAXA conducted the operation again on the night of the 27th, but there was no response from SLIM. As the sun has set around SLIM and power generation is no longer possible, this lunar day's operation has unsuccessfully ended.

JAXA planned to try operating SLIM again the next month, when it was expected to have sufficient solar power. However, all attempts to re-establish communication with the craft failed, and as of August 26th, the mission was officially concluded.

Animation of SLIM

Around the Earth

Around the Moon

SLIM · Earth · Moon
SLIM landing site by Lunar Reconnaissance Orbiter Camera (LROC)

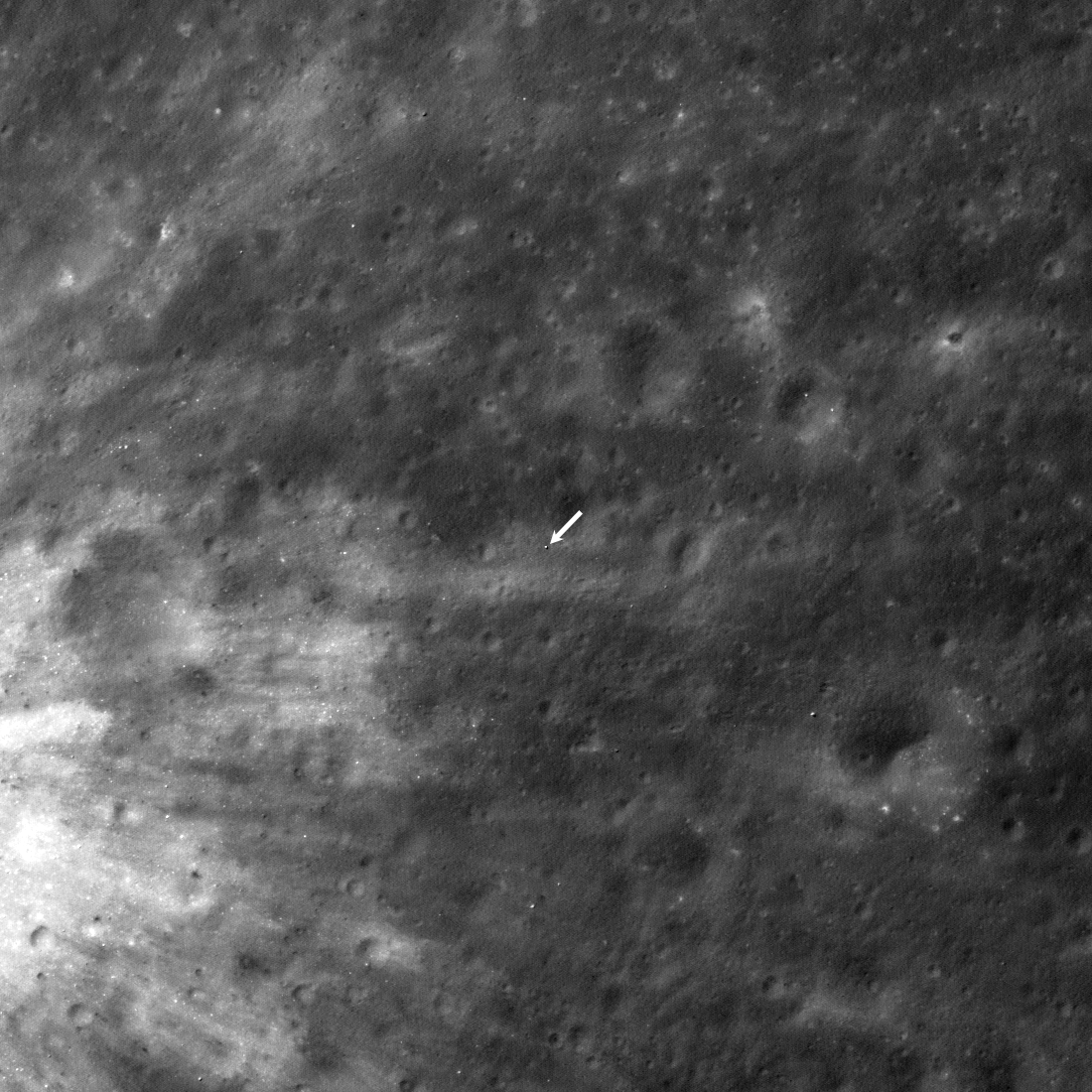
JAXA SLIM landing site imaged by LROC

Before/After animation of landing site

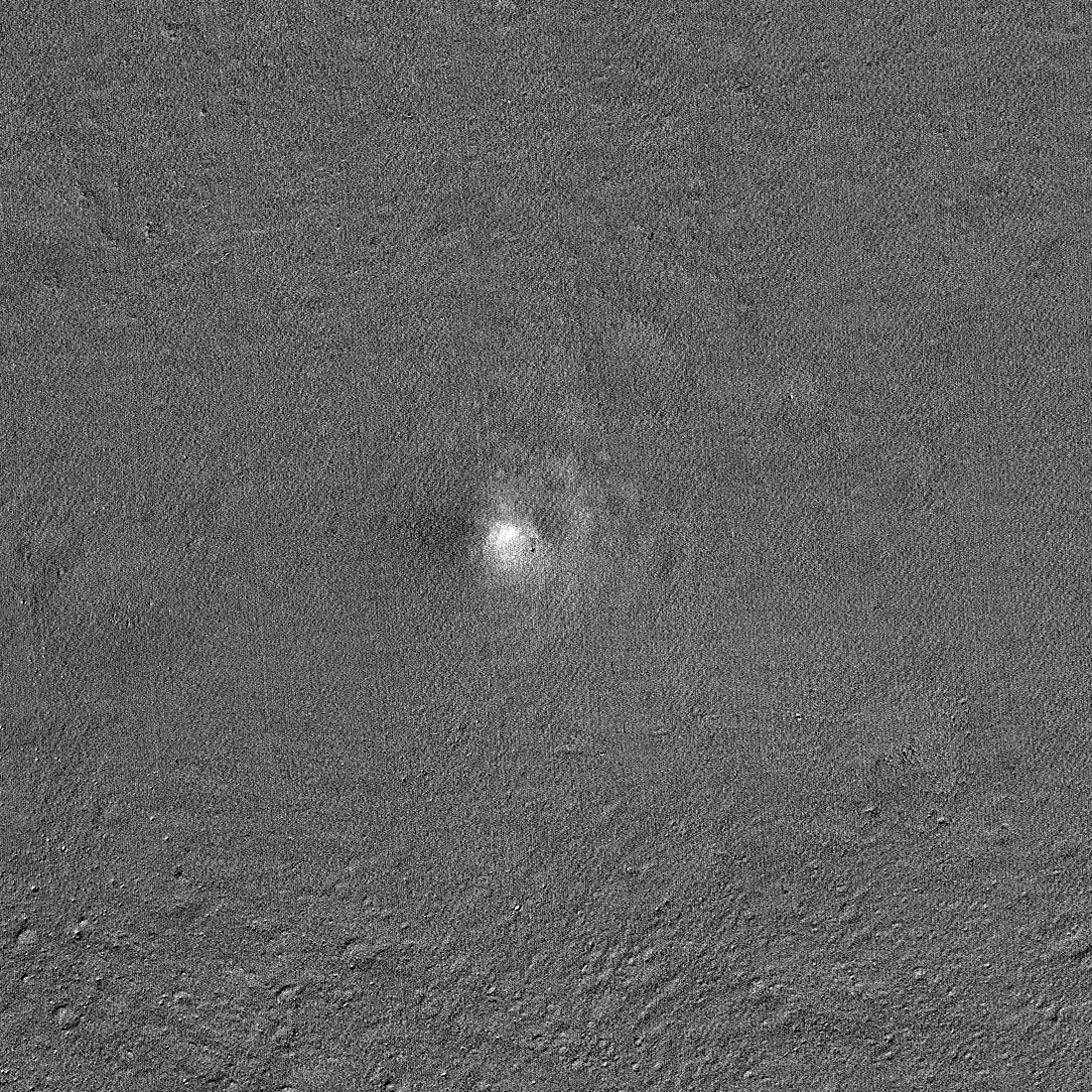
Composite image landing site showing surface reflectivity changes

== See also ==
- List of landing ellipses on extraterrestrial bodies
- Japanese Lunar Exploration Program
  - Hiten – 1990 Japanese lunar probe
  - LUPEX – Lunar exploration mission by India and Japan
- List of missions to the Moon
  - Chandrayaan-3
