= Hakuto-R Mission 2 =

Lunar landing mission by Japanese ispace

Hakuto-R Mission 2 Resilience
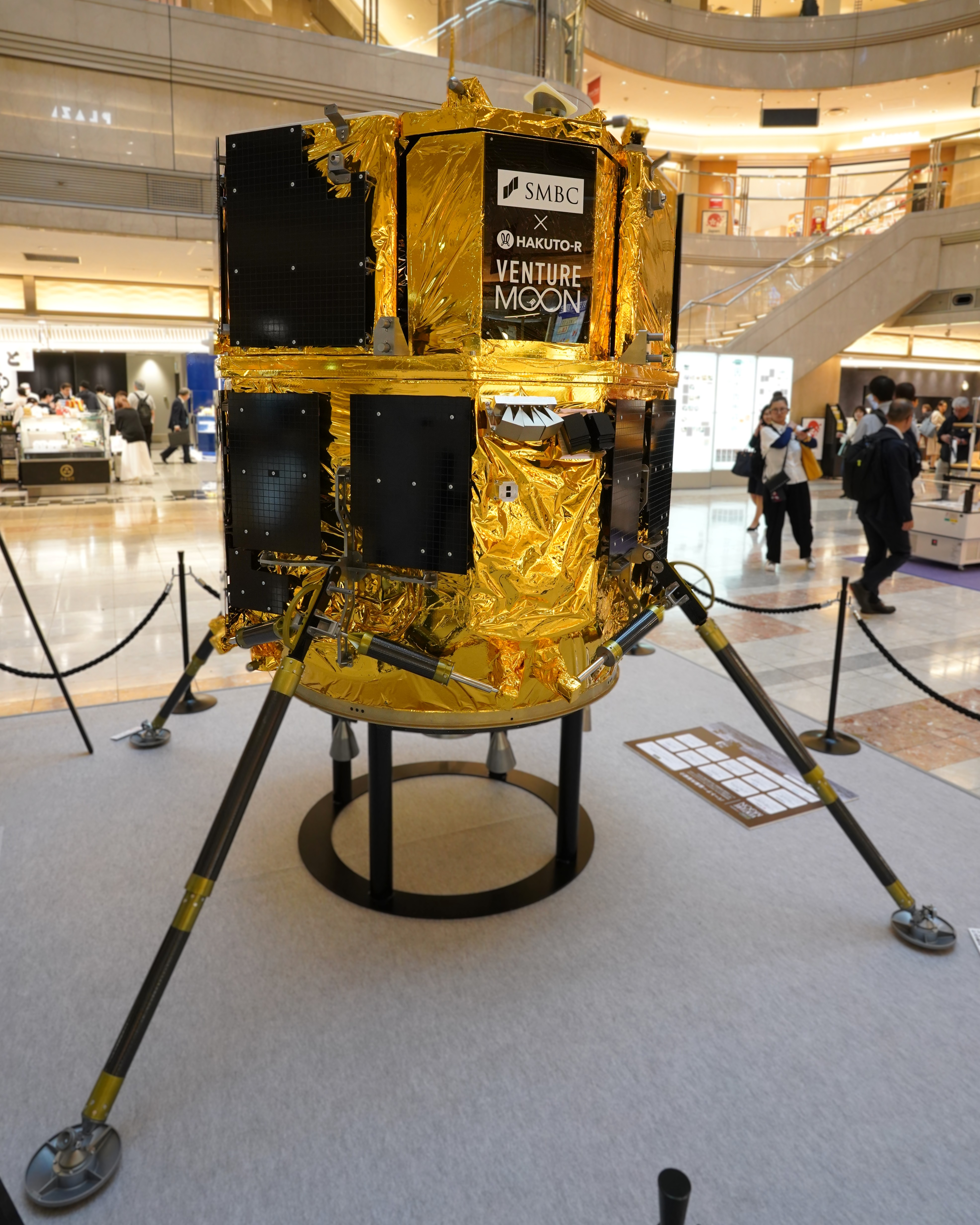
- Full-size model of Hakuto-R
- Mission type: Lunar landing, technology demonstration
- Operator: ispace
- COSPAR ID: 2025-010B
- SATCAT no.: 62717
- Website: ispace-inc.com/m2
- Mission duration: 4 months and 20 days

Spacecraft properties
- Spacecraft: Hakuto-R Resilience
- Spacecraft type: Lunar lander
- Bus: Hakuto-R
- Manufacturer: ispace
- Launch mass: ~1,000 kg (2,200 lb)
- Dry mass: 340 kg (750 lb)
- Dimensions: Width: 2.5 m (8 ft 2 in); Height: 2.3 m (7 ft 7 in)

Start of mission
- Launch date: 15 January 2025, 06:11:39 UTC (1:11:39 am EST)
- Rocket: Falcon 9 Block 5 (B1085‑5), Flight 425
- Launch site: Kennedy, LC-39A
- Contractor: SpaceX

Resilience Lunar impact (failed landing)
- Impact date: 5 June 2025
- Impact site: Mare Frigoris (60.5°N 4.6°W)

Hakuto-R Mission 2, also called Resilience, was a robotic lunar landing mission launched on 15 January 2025. Developed by the Japanese company ispace, the lander was intended to deliver a small rover manufactured by the company's European subsidiary, as well as other payloads. Like Hakuto-R Mission 1, this mission served as a technology demonstration, with the final goal of providing reliable transportation and data services on the Moon. The lander was named RESILIENCE. Communications were lost approximately 90 seconds before the projected landing and the lander crashed on the Moon.

== Background ==
The project began development after Hakuto-R Mission 1 in 2023. The mission used the same overall design with upgrades from flight data collected in mission 1.

== Lander specifications ==
The RESILIENCE lander stood 2.3 metres (7 ft 7 in) high, 2.3 metres (7 ft 7 in) wide and had a weight of 340 kilograms (750 lb). The lander included a micro rover planned to perform an in situ resource utilization demonstration.

== Mission timeline ==
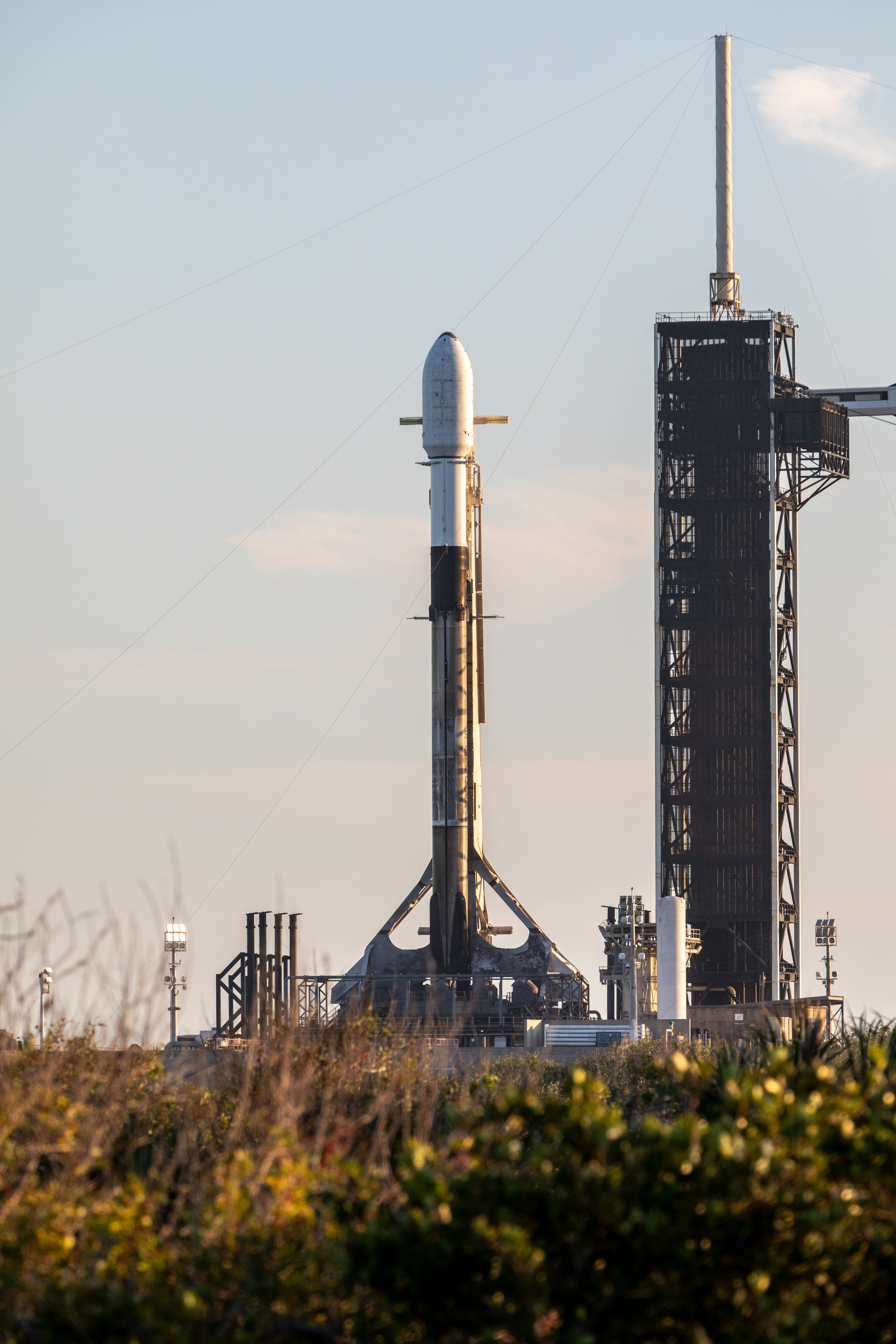
Falcon 9 rocket at Kennedy Space Center shortly before the launch of Blue Ghost Mission 1 and Hakuto-R Mission 2

The lander completed successful vacuum testing in June 2024. The rover, later to be integrated with the lander, was completed in August 2024. In November 2024, the lander had arrived at the launch site in Florida.

The mission was launched on 15 January 2025 at 06:11:39 UTC (1:11:39 am EST, local time at the launch site) on a Falcon 9 Block 5 launch vehicle.

The lander successfully carried out a flyby of the Moon by 15 February, and was expected to land no earlier than 6 June. The significant difference in landing dates between it and Blue Ghost, launched at the same time, is due to choice of a longer trajectory in order to save energy.

The space probe successfully reached lunar orbit on 6 May. On 28 May, the spacecraft performed an orbital control maneuver that brought it into a circular lunar orbit about 100 km above the surface.

The mission was scheduled to land on Thursday, 5 June, at 19:17 UTC, assuming the primary landing spot in the middle of Mare Frigoris was chosen. If ispace decided to use one of the three backup landing sites, those attempts would occur on different times.

On 5 June 2025, the lander failed to complete its landing, impacting the lunar surface. On 24 June 2025, the company released a technical analysis identifying an anomaly in the Laser Range Finder (LRF) as the cause of the hard landing.

== Landing site ==
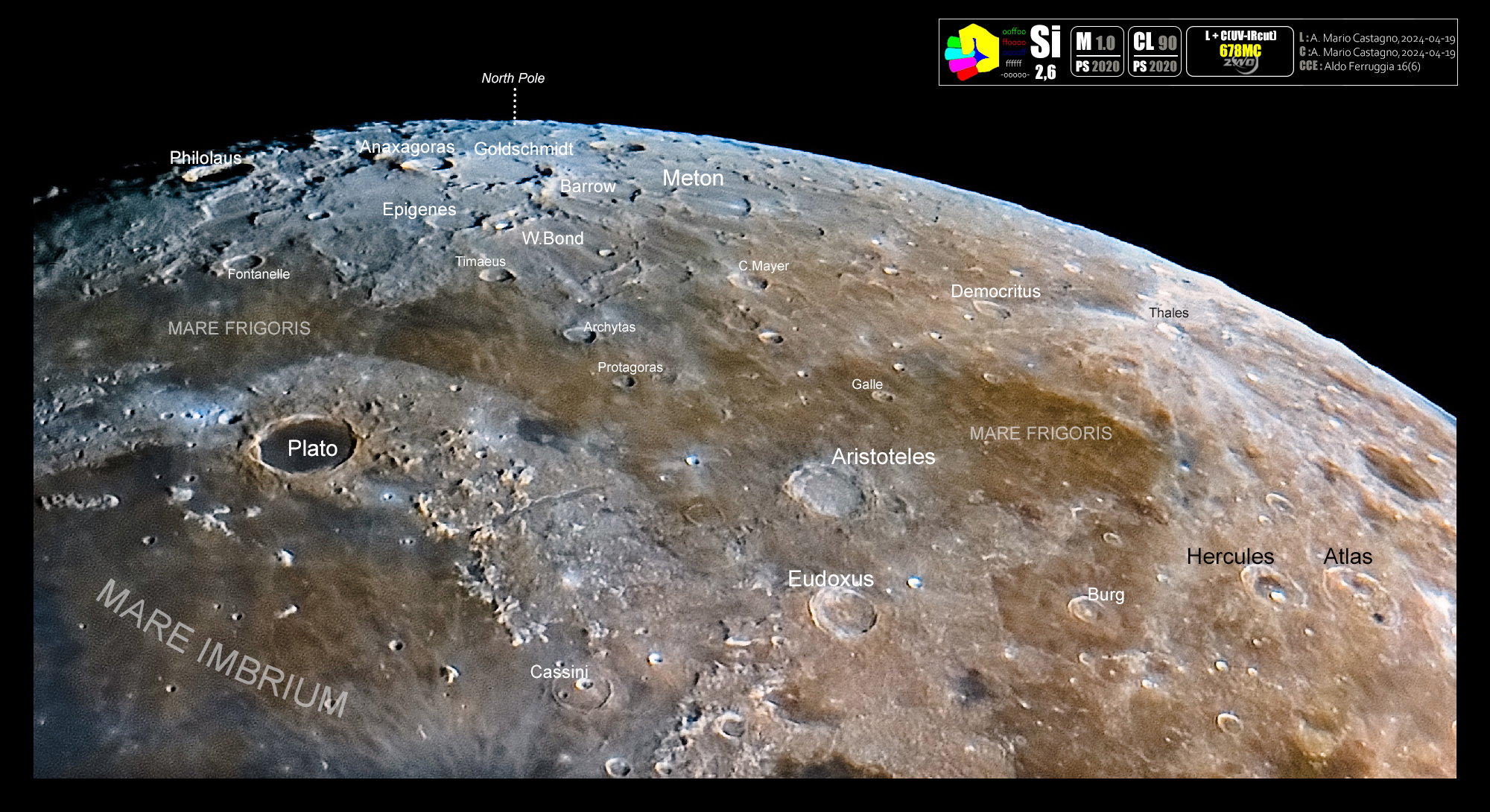
Mare Frigoris

The intended landing site for the mission was in the far northern Mare Frigoris (60.5 degrees north latitude and 4.6 degrees west longitude), a northern location still allowing continuous line-of-sight radio communication from Earth. The three backup landing sites are also located in Mare Frigoris.

This is the same general area of the Moon targeted by Hakuto-R Mission 1 in 2023. However, ispace did not attempt to land Hakuto-R 2 in Atlas Crater.

== Payloads ==
=== Rover ===
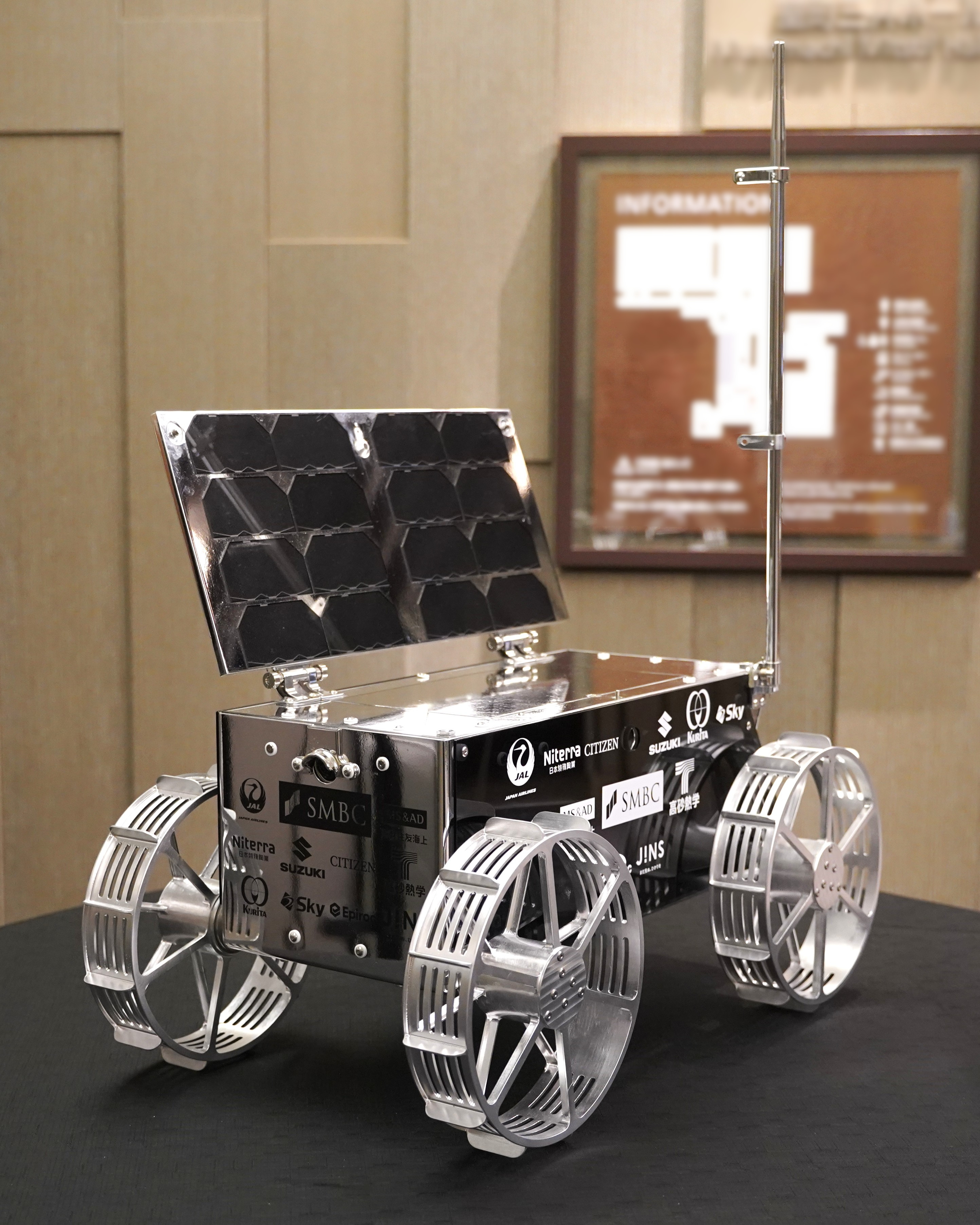
TENACIOUS rover

The mission included a 5 kg (11 lb) rover called TENACIOUS, designed and manufactured in Luxembourg, which was planned to explore the area around the landing site after being lowered to the lunar surface from the lander. TENACIOUS is the first European-built lunar rover. It was developed with co-funding from the Luxembourg National Space Programme (managed by LSA, implemented by ESA).

The rover was carrying Moonhouse, a Falu red miniature cottage artwork designed by Mikael Genberg. The Moonhouse homepage doesn't afterwords directly mention the crash, but concludes "It was never about going there. It was about being here", presenting the impact coordinates and concept images as evident success.

=== Lander payloads ===
In addition to the rover, the RESILIENCE lander carried payloads from Takasago Thermal Engineering Co., Euglena Co., National Central University, and Bandai Namco Research Institute, Inc. The lander also carried a memory disk co-developed by UNESCO and Barrelhand, which contained UNESCO Constitution's Preamble in 275 languages and other cultural artifacts.

== Communication ==
The European Space Agency (ESA) supported the mission's operations by providing communication services using its ESTRACK network of antennas. The rover TENACIOUS was to be controlled from ispace Europe SA's control centre in Luxembourg. The commands were to be first sent to ESA's ESOC in Germany and then relayed through the ESTRACK antennas to the Moon. Communications were lost just before the projected landing, due to the lander crashing on the Moon.

== See also ==
- List of missions to the Moon
