= Ispace Inc. =

Private Japanese company

ispace Inc.
- Type: Lunar robotic spacecraft
- Traded as: TYO: 9348
- Industry: Commercial lunar lander and rover
- Predecessor: White Label Space
- Founded: September 10, 2010; 16 years ago in Tokyo, Japan
- Founder: Takeshi Hakamada
- Headquarters: Tokyo, Japan
- Products: Robotic lunar landers and rovers
- Number of employees: 200 (August 2022)
- Website: ispace-inc.com

ispace Inc. is a publicly traded Japanese company developing robotic spacecraft and other technology to compete for both transportation and exploration mission contracts from space agencies and other private industries. ispace's mission is to enable its clients to discover, map, and use natural lunar resources.

From 2013 to 2018, ispace was the owner and operator of the Hakuto team that competed in Google Lunar X Prize (GLXP). The team developed a lunar rover named Sorato.

ispace is headquartered in Tokyo, Japan, with offices in the United States and Luxembourg. The company's founder and CEO is Takeshi Hakamada.

ispace's Hakuto-R program, supported by Japanese funding and partnered with American Draper Laboratory, aims to offer lunar transport and exploration. Hakuto-R Mission 1, launched in December 2022 carrying the Rashid rover, failed during its April 2023 landing attempt. Hakuto-R Mission 2, launched in January 2025 with the RESILIENCE lander and a UNESCO "memory disk," also failed to establish communication after its attempted landing in June 2025, suggesting a hard landing. Future lander missions, starting with Mission 3 in 2028, will focus on establishing high-frequency, cost-effective lunar transport and lunar water resource development.

Ispace Inc. at 9th Bengaluru Space Expo 2026, BIEC

== History ==
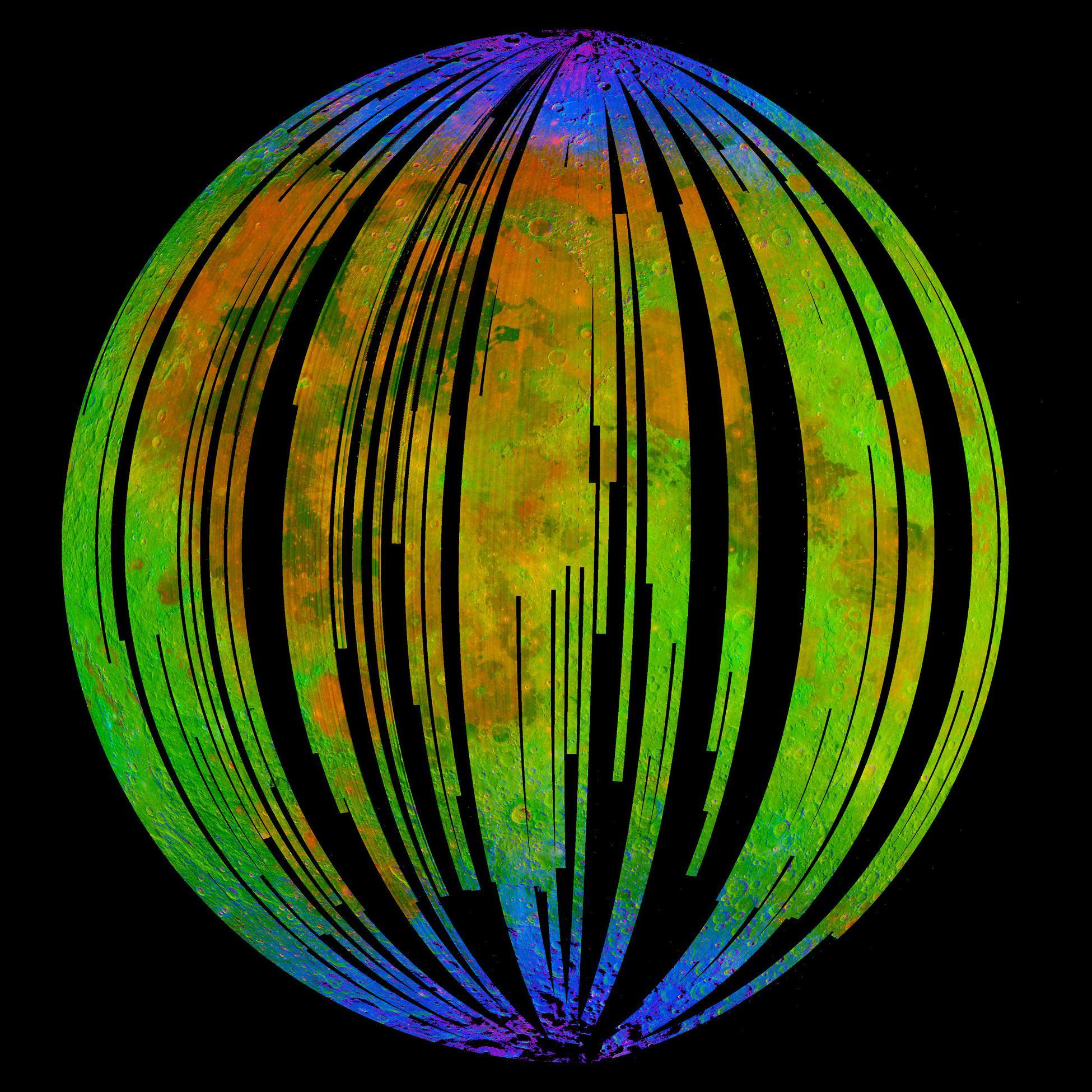
Image of the Moon taken by the Moon Mineralogy Mapper. Blue shows the spectral signature of hydroxide (component of water), green shows the brightness of the surface as measured by reflected infrared radiation from the Sun and red shows a mineral called pyroxene.

Although ispace later became independent, it began as a partner of a European organization called White Label Space. White Label Space (WLS) was an international team of space engineers that was founded in 2008 to compete in the Google Lunar X Prize, for a grand prize of US$20 million to send a spacecraft to the Moon's surface, and have it travel 500 meters. WLS was headquartered in the Netherlands and led by Steve Allen. The European side aimed to develop the team's lunar lander while the Japanese group consisting of Tohoku University Space Robotics Lab and led by Kazuya Yoshida was to develop a rover.

In 2010, White Label Space Japan LLC, the predecessor of ispace was founded by Takeshi Hakamada to manage the commercial and technical aspect of the Japanese group. On 30 January 2013, when the European teammates ceased substantial involvement in the prize, the Japan-based members decided to continue the work, and WLS transferred the GLXP participation right to White Label Space Japan LLC. Steve Allen, WLS's leader was succeeded by Takeshi Hakamada.

In May 2013, the team's parent company, White Label Space Japan changed its name to ispace, while the GLXP team was renamed "Hakuto" on 15 July of the same year. Team Hakuto did not succeed in undertaking a lunar mission during the GLXP, but following the cessation of the competition, ispace continued its lunar exploration plans and, in 2018, the company succeeded in raising over US$90 million in private funding to develop its own lunar lander in addition to continuing its work on lunar rovers.

By September 2018, ispace planned to test their systems by orbiting around the Moon but not land on it. The company signed up for two launches on SpaceX's Falcon 9 rockets, to take place in 2020 and 2021.

On 10 October 2018, an industry team formed by Draper Laboratory, along with ispace, General Atomics, and Spaceflight Industries submitted a proposal for a commercial lunar lander to NASA's Commercial Lunar Payload Services Program. According to Draper, ispace will serve as the team's design agent.

As of 2019, ispace was developing a mission concept called Polar Ice Explorer that could prospect for lunar resources on a region near the lunar south pole.

On 21 July 2022, NASA announced that it had awarded a CLPS contract to Draper Laboratories and the team.

== Hakuto-R program ==
The long-term strategy of ispace is to build landers and rovers to compete for both transportation and exploration mission contracts from space agencies and private industry. NASA aims at contracting private industries to scout and mine lunar water and other lunar resources to support a future Moon-based infrastructure. The funding for the first two missions was originally secured from a consortium of Japanese funds and companies.

In 2018, ispace signed a working agreement with Draper to serve as the team's design agent, which brought about significant changes. In August 2019, ispace announced a restructuring of its lunar program, now called Hakuto-R, in light of rapid increases in customer demand for payload delivery services in the lunar exploration industry, especially from the recent Commercial Lunar Payload Services (CLPS) contract awarded to Draper and its partners, including ispace. A significant change was the elimination of the technology demonstration orbiter mission in 2020 in favor of moving more quickly toward a demonstration of landing capabilities.

=== Hakuto-R Mission 1 ===
Hakuto-R Mission 1 is a lunar lander carrying the Emirates Lunar Mission rover Rashid in a partnership with the Mohammed bin Rashid Space Centre (MBRSC), along with Tomy and JAXA's Sora-Q transformable lunar robot. Hakuto-R Mission 1 houses another payload, that is, a music disc featuring the song ‘SORATO’ by the Japanese rock band Sakanaction. The song was initially released in 2018 as a part of the Team Hakuto campaign for the Google Lunar XPRIZE.

Hakuto-R Mission 1 was launched on 11 December 2022 at 07:38 UTC on a Falcon 9 Block 5 rocket, along with Emirates Lunar Mission and NASA's Lunar Flashlight spacecraft. The mission entered lunar orbit on 21 March 2023 with a lunar landing attempt scheduled for 25 April 2023. Communication with Hakuto-R was lost during the final moments of descent to the lunar surface on 25 April. Analysis determined that a loss of propellant in the final stage of landing led to a rapid descent and hard landing on the lunar surface.

=== Hakuto-R Mission 2 ===
Hakuto-R Mission 2, carrying the RESILIENCE lunar lander and micro rover called "TENACIOUS", was launched on 15 January 2025. In partnership with UNESCO, ispace delivered a "memory disk" containing 275 languages and other cultural artifacts, aiming to preserve a piece of humanity alive in case of a future threat to humankind's existence on Earth. In June 2024, the company reported that the mission was on track for launch in late 2024, with completion of vacuum testing of the lander with actual launch in January 2025. Landing was expected in Mare Frigoris around 6 June 2025. The mission was scheduled to land on Thursday, 5 June 2025, at 19:17 UTC, assuming the primary landing spot in the middle of Mare Frigoris was chosen. If ispace decided to use one of the three backup landing sites, those attempts would occur on different times.

On 5 June 2025, the lander failed to complete its landing, impacting the lunar surface.

== Mission 3 and beyond ==
A model of the ULTRA lander.

ispace Mission 3, delivering the APEX 1.0 lunar lander to Schrödinger Basin on the far side of the Moon, was initially expected to launch in 2026. Missions 3 through 9 aimed to establish ispace's lunar lander as a high-frequency cost-effective transportation system, while Mission 10 and beyond would begin the construction of an "industrial platform" to enable the development of lunar water resources. The European Space Agency (ESA) has contracted ispace to develop the Mission for Advanced Geophysics and Polar Ice Exploration (MAGPIE), the first ESA-led surface mission on the Moon.

On 9 May 2025 ispace announced that Mission 3 would use an engine design different from what had originally been planned, and would launch no earlier than 2027.

On 27 March 2026, ispace announced a comprehensive reorganization of its mission cadence and plans. Missions 4 and 6 on the previous plan would be reassigned as Missions 3 and 4 respectively, while the old Mission 3 to Schrödinger Basin would be reassigned as Mission 5 in 2030. ispace also unveiled the ULTRA lander, a consolidation of ispace's previous APEX 1.0 and Series-3 lander designs.

List of ispace Missions
| No. | Spacecraft | Launch date | Launch vehicle | Status | Notes | Ref. |
|---|---|---|---|---|---|---|
| 2.5 | Argo Space OTV; Alpine | 2027 | TBA | Planned | First lunar communications satellite for ispace's Lunar Connect Service. | |
| 3 | ULTRA; Lupine | 2028 | H3-22S | Planned | First ULTRA lander mission. JAXA Space Strategy Fund (SSF) First Phase. | |
| 4 | ULTRA; Lunar Orbiting Satellite 3 & 4 | 2029 | TBA | Planned | Mission for Advanced Geophysics and Polar Ice Exploration (MAGPIE). SSF Second Phase. | |
| 5 | ULTRA; Lunar Orbiting Satellite 5 | 2030 | Falcon 9 Block 5 | Planned | Team Draper Commercial Mission 1. CLPS CP-12. | |

== See also ==
- Artemis-7, lander designed by ispace
- Colonization of the Moon
- Hakuto
- Luna-27
- Lunar resources
- Lunar water
- Moon Express, a similar company aiming to mine the Moon
- Private spaceflight
- SELENE-R, potential application of ispace instruments
- List of European Space Agency programmes and missions
