= Hakuto-R Mission 1 =

Lunar landing mission by Japanese ispace

Hakuto-R M1
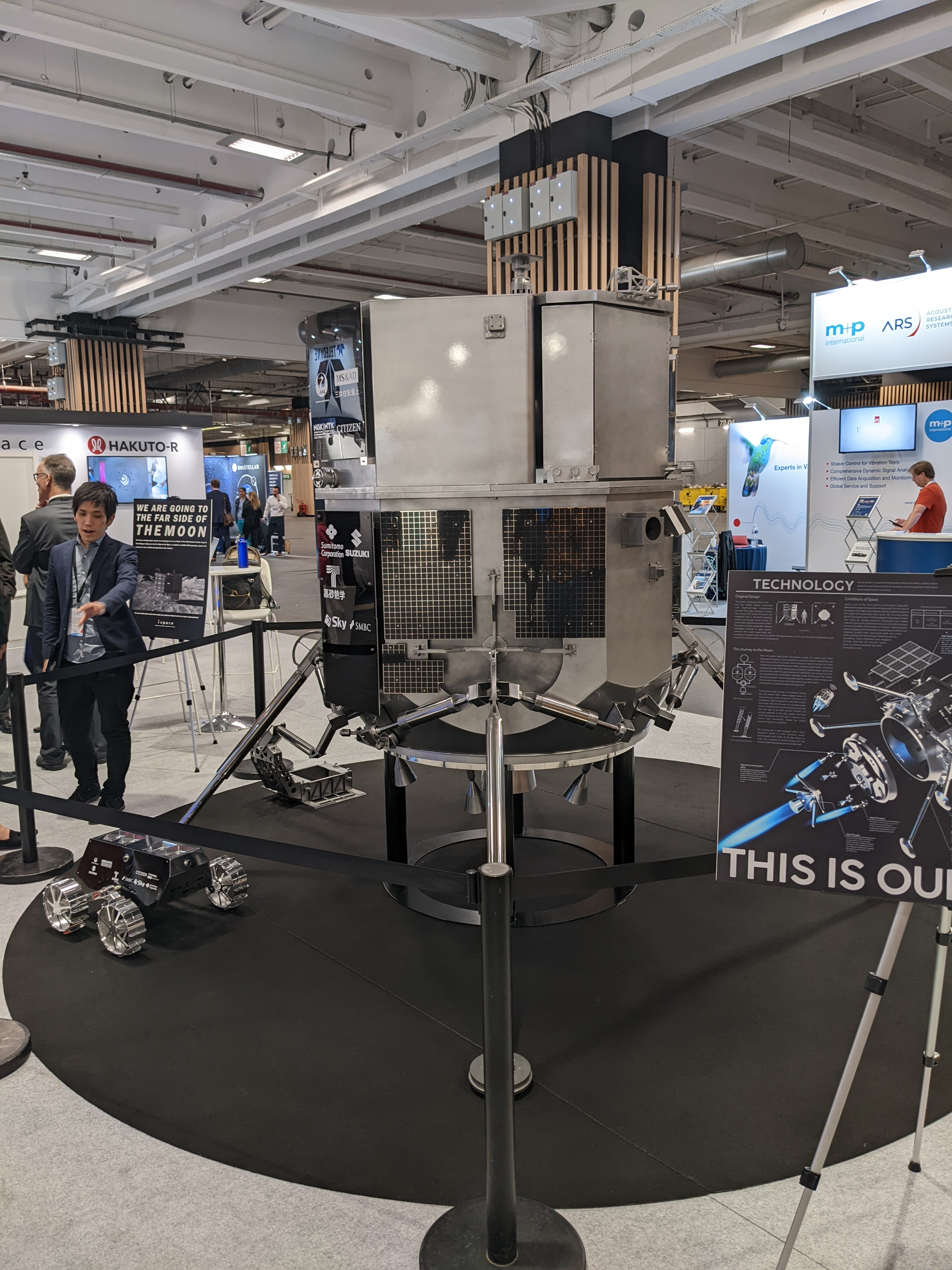
- Full-size model of Hakuto-R
- Mission type: Lunar lander / Technology
- Operator: ispace
- COSPAR ID: 2022-168A
- SATCAT no.: 54696
- Website: ispace-inc.com/m1
- Mission duration: 135 days, 9 hours, 2 minutes

Spacecraft properties
- Spacecraft: Hakuto-R
- Manufacturer: ispace
- Launch mass: 1,000 kg (2,200 lb)
- Dry mass: 340 kg (750 lb)
- Dimensions: 2.3 × 2.6 m (7.5 × 8.5 ft)

Start of mission
- Launch date: 11 December 2022, 07:38 UTC
- Rocket: Falcon 9 Block 5 B1073-5
- Launch site: CCSFS, SLC-40
- Contractor: SpaceX

Moon impact (failed landing)
- Impact date: 25 April 2023, 16:40 UTC
- Impact site: Atlas crater 47.581°N 44.094°E
- Hakuto-R Mission 1 patch Hakuto-R

Hakuto-R Mission 1 was a failed private Japanese uncrewed lunar landing mission built and operated by ispace, which was launched in December 2022 for an attempted lunar landing in April 2023.

This first Hakuto mission was primarily a technology demonstrator and carried the Emirates Lunar Mission. Travelling approximately 1,400,000 kilometres (870,000 mi), it is the furthest a privately funded spacecraft has traveled. Communication with the lander was lost during the final seconds of its April 2023 descent.

== Background ==
The project began with engineer Andrew Barton in 2008, who sought to win the Google Lunar X Prize by landing a privately funded rover on the Moon, and gathered an international group of professionals to create White Label Space. Takeshi Hakamada would found ispace in 2010 as a Japanese branch of White Label Space Many of the professionals abandoned the project by 2013, though a group of Japanese members sought to continue with the project, which was renamed from White Label Space to Hakuto, based on the white Hare of Inaba in Japanese mythology. By 2017, ispace had secured $90 million in funding and though no teams in the Google Lunar X Prize ever launched before the 2018 deadline, the Hakuto team would continue. In April 2022, iSpace was placed on the Tokyo Stock Exchange, receiving a 65% increase in its share price within two weeks.

== Lander specifications ==
The Hakuto-R lander was measured at 2.3 metres (7.5 ft) tall by 2.6 metres (8.5 ft) wide, with a total weight of approximately 1,000 kilograms (2,200 lb) with its payload and fuel. To perform a stable landing, the lander was equipped with four landing legs and a main thruster.

== Mission ==
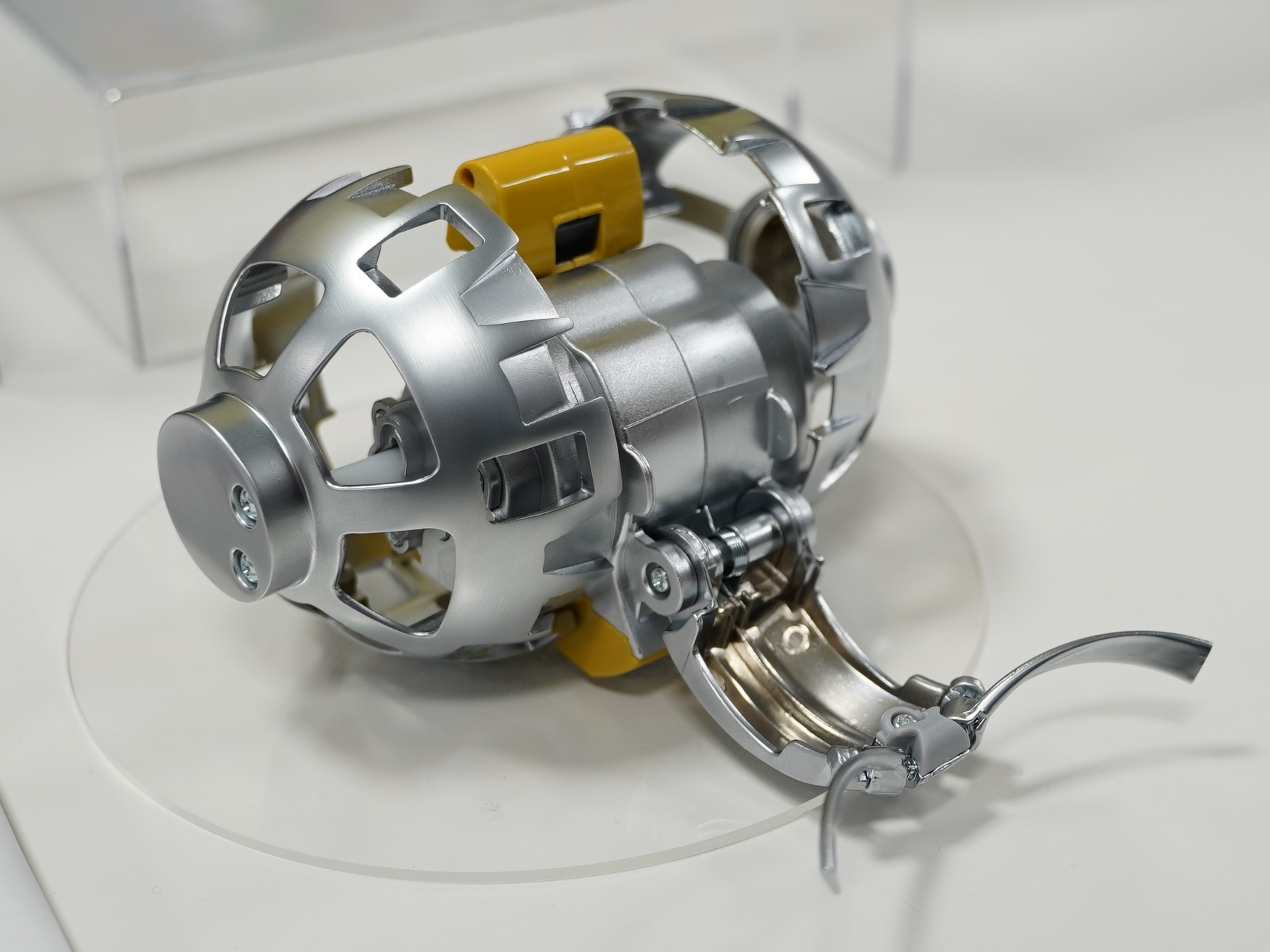
Sora-Q mini rover

Hakuto-R Mission 1 was launched on 11 December 2022 aboard a Falcon 9 rocket, separating from the rocket 47 minutes later at a distance around 970 kilometres (600 mi) away from Earth. Inside the spacecraft were payloads from the Emirates Lunar Mission rover Rashid in a partnership with the Mohammed bin Rashid Space Centre (MBRSC), along with Tomy and JAXA's Sora-Q transformable lunar robot. The lander also housed another payload, a music disc featuring the song 'SORATO' by the Japanese rock band Sakanaction, which was initially released in 2018 as a part of the Team Hakuto campaign for the Google Lunar X Prize.

Using data collected from a previous lunar scanning mission, ispace determined that the mission would attempt a landing in the Atlas crater in the Mare Frigoris region of the Moon; three other backup locations were selected, like those in Lacus Somniorum, Sinus Iridum and Oceanus Procellarum, among others. In an effort to conserve fuel, the mission used a slower path to approach the Moon, entering lunar orbit in March 2023.

== Landing attempt ==
After a five-month travel time, the mission traveled 1,400,000 kilometres (870,000 mi), further than any privately funded spacecraft, to attempt a lunar landing on 25 April 2023.

During the official live-stream, among the four possible landing locations, the site in Lacus Somniorum was initially shown in the animation, saying it was based on real-time telemetry from the lander; that later turned out to be misleading, since the telemetry coming from the lander was not reliable, and the actual attempted landing site was near Atlas crater, as had been decided initially.

Communication with the lander was lost during the final moments of descent to the lunar surface at 16:40 UTC (00:40 JST) on 25 April Analysis determined that the lander plummeted uncontrollably when the propellant was exhausted. This happened because the onboard computer incorrectly presumed the radar altimeter was faulty, and ignoring its data, misjudged the actual altitude of the spacecraft and kept hovering 5 km above the surface of the Moon.

The crash site was later identified by NASA's Lunar Reconnaissance Orbiter team on 23 May 2023.

Impact Site of the HAKUTO-R Mission 1 Lunar Lander

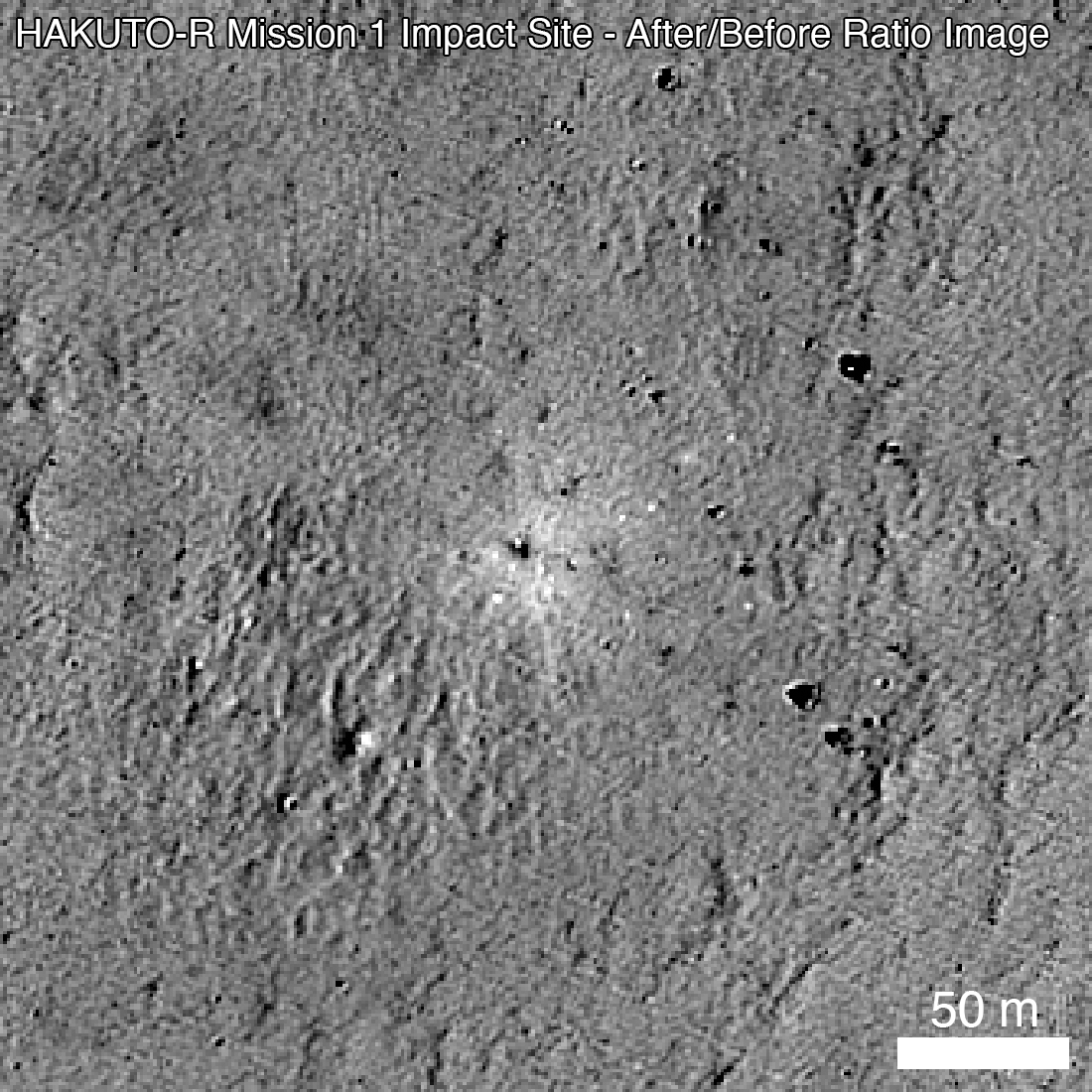
Ejecta field around impact site

Before and after image of the impact site

Before and after images of the impact site

== See also ==
- Japanese Lunar Exploration Program
  - EQUULEUS
  - Hiten (spacecraft)
  - OMOTENASHI
  - SELENE
  - Smart Lander for Investigating Moon
- List of missions to the Moon
  - Lunar Flashlight (launched as a rideshare)
