= Sora-Q =

Miniature Lunar rover

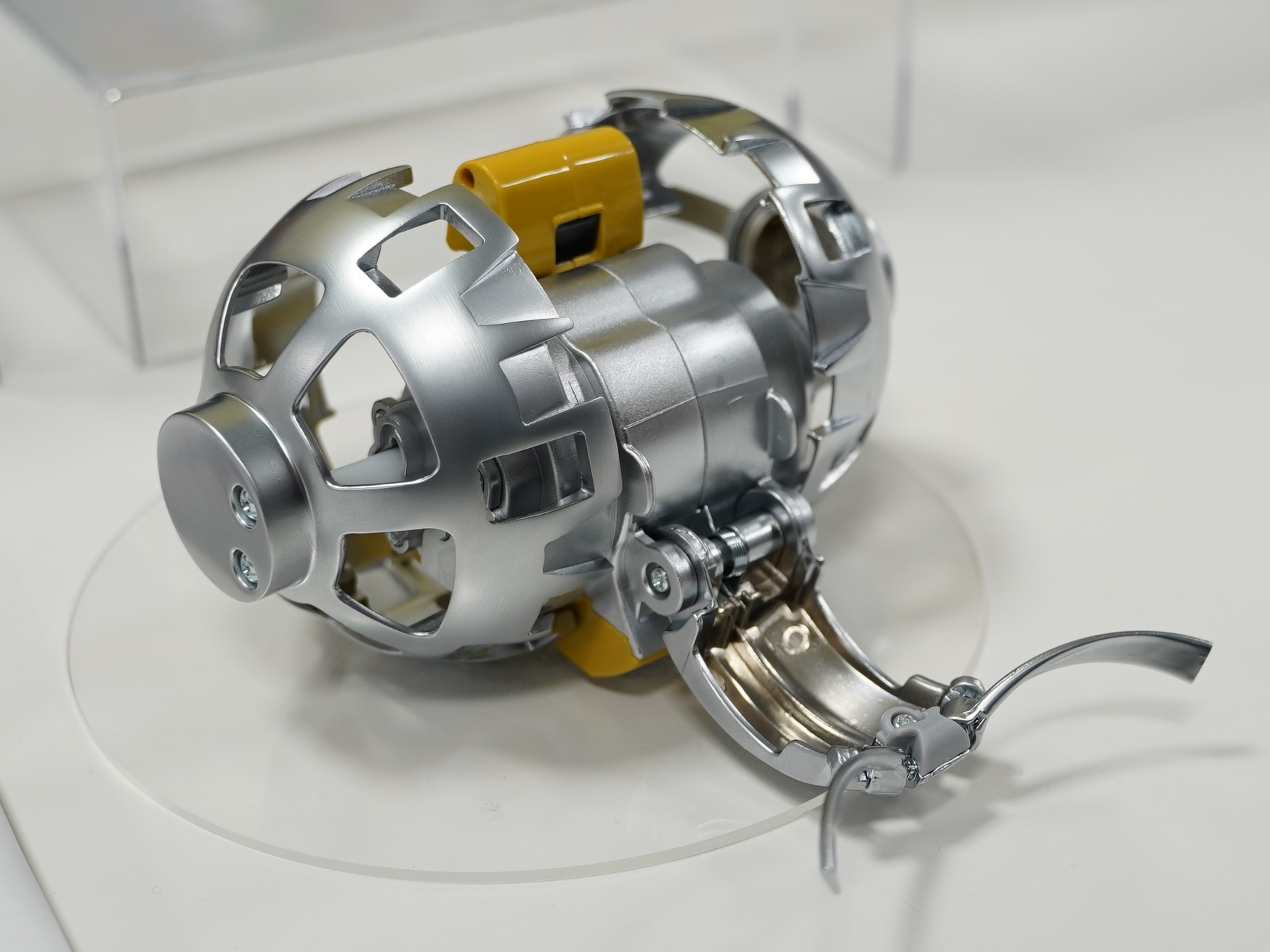
Sora-Q back view

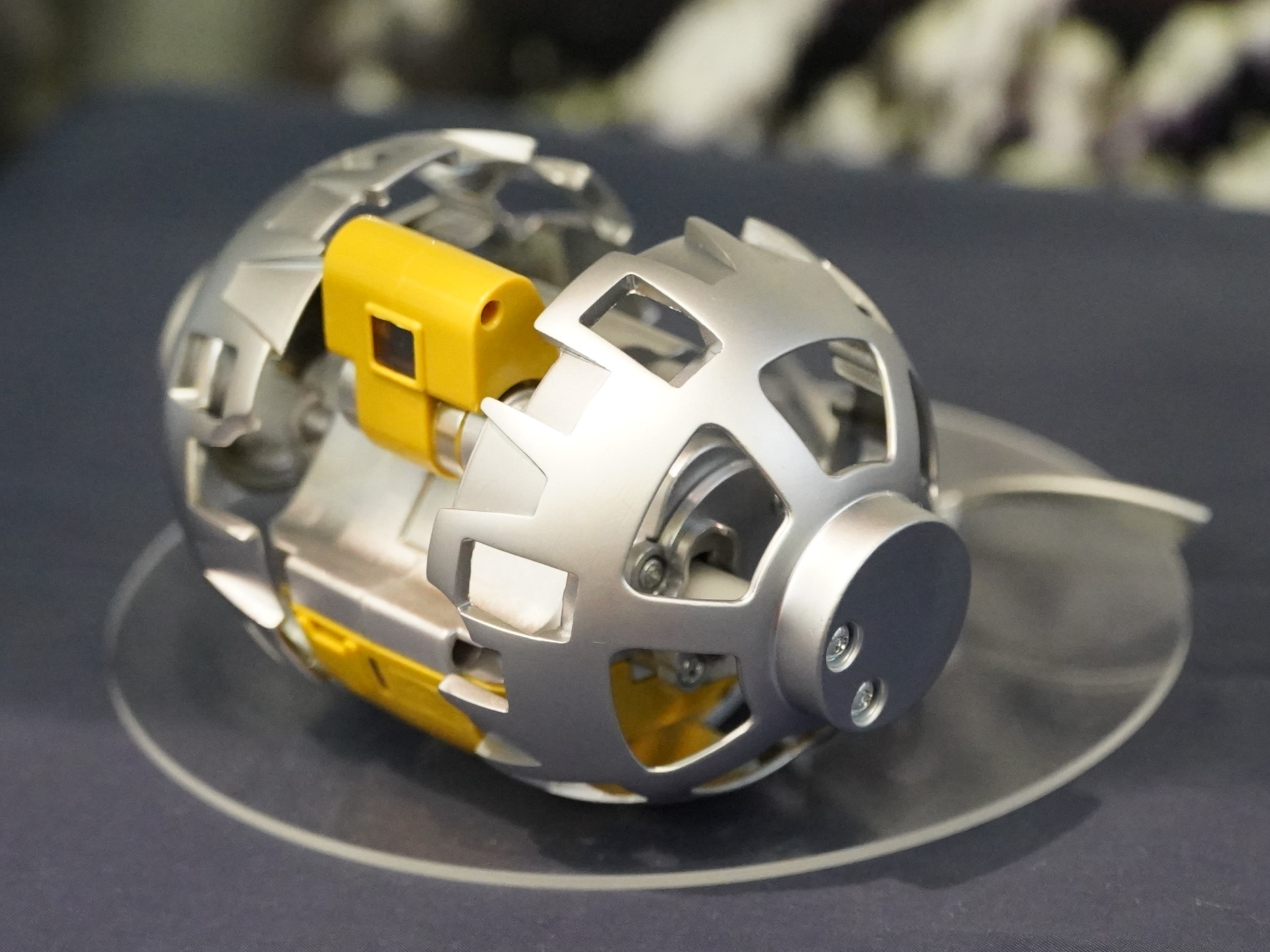
Front view

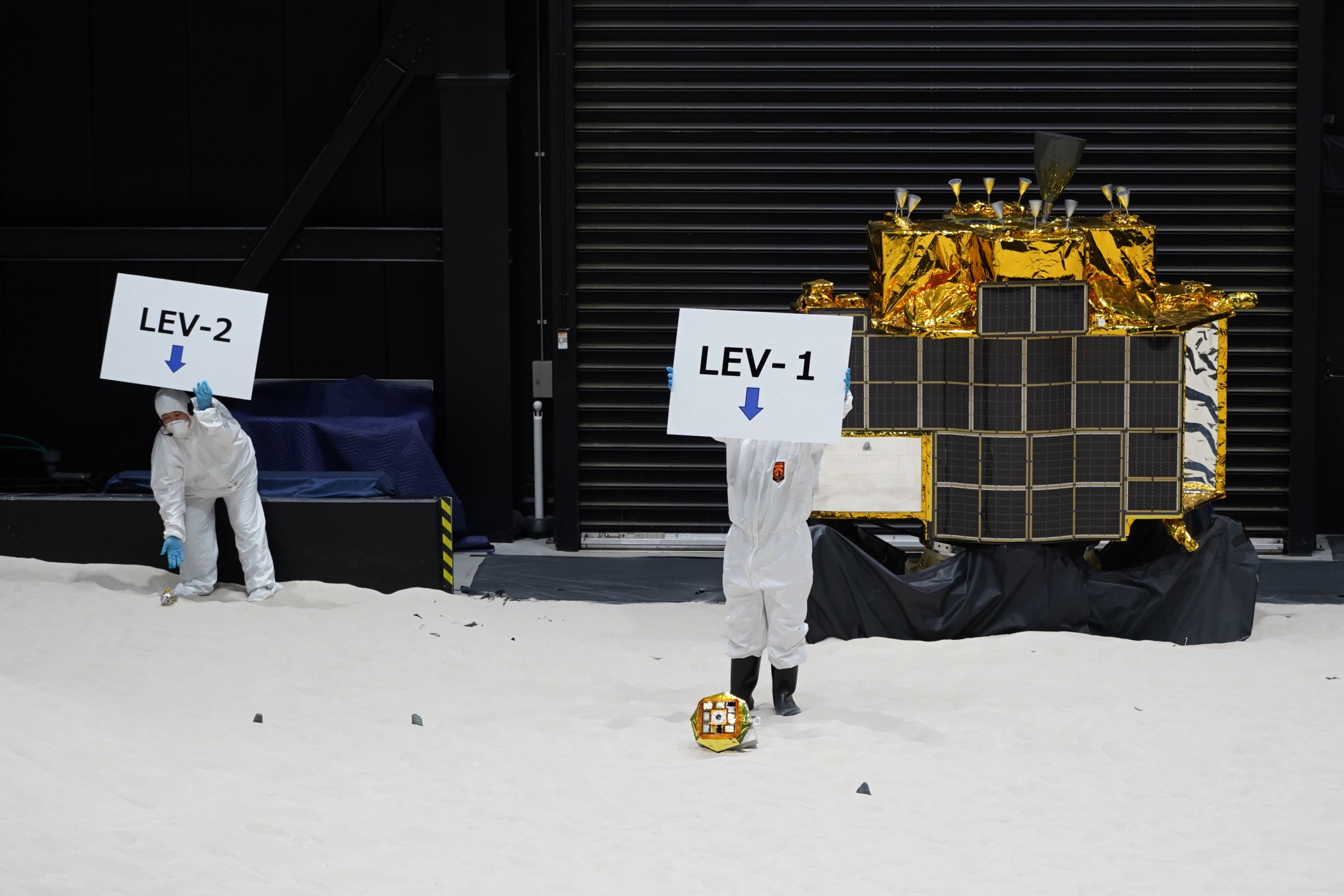
The SLIM lander with LEV-1 and LEV-2 (Sora-Q) rovers

Sora-Q is a miniature Lunar rover designed and made by Japanese space agency JAXA, toy manufacturer Tomy, Sony, and Doshisha University.

== History ==
It was launched to the Moon first on the failed Hakuto-R Mission 1 in 2022, and on 2023 Smart Lander for Investigating Moon mission, where it is officially called the Lunar Excursion Vehicle 2 (LEV-2). The rover was successfully deployed and operated after landing on January 19, 2024.

The baseball-sized rover has a mass of 250 g and diameter of 8 cm and is equipped with two small cameras. LEV-2 extends its shape to crawl on the lunar surface using two wheels at its sides, a method of locomotion inspired by frogs and sea turtles; it can "run" for approximately two hours.
