= MoonLITE =

Proposed British space mission

- Mission type: Lunar orbiter/penetrator
- Operator: UK Space Agency

Start of mission
- Launch date: 2014 (was planned)

Orbital parameters
- Reference system: Selenocentric

Lunar orbiter

The Moon Lightweight Interior and Telecoms Experiment (MoonLITE), was a proposed British space mission to explore the Moon and develop techniques for future space exploration. If funded, it would have been built by a consortium of UK industry likely including Surrey Satellite Technology, and it was planned to be launched into lunar orbit in 2014. The mission concept emerged from a study run by the Particle Physics and Astronomy Research Council (now the Science and Technology Facilities Council) in 2006. In December 2008, the British National Space Centre (part of the UK Space Agency since April 2010) announced that the project was moving to a 12-month Phase A study of the mission systems and the planned penetrators.

== Objectives ==
The mission has both scientific and technological goals. The science goals are concerned with the interior structure, history and current state of the Moon. MoonLITE would deploy four one metre-long penetrators into the lunar surface in order to emplace a global network of seismometers, heat flow sensors and - possibly - volatile detectors. This would allow the internal structure of the Moon to be determined as well as exploring the frequency and origin of moonquakes. It would be the first space mission dedicated to studying the interior structure of the Moon since the experiments emplaced by the Apollo astronauts. Beyond the scientific value, the enhanced knowledge of the seismic environment would support engineering design and safety requirements for a future human lunar outpost.

One of the technological goals is to demonstrate for the first time a lunar telecommunications network able to communicate with four stations on the lunar surface and relay data back to Earth. Such a comms network would be needed for future robotic and lunar explorers, especially for a human outpost located near the South Pole where line of sight communications would be limited. Another objective is to prove the feasibility of penetrators for deploying scientific payloads. Although extensive work has been carried out on the technique in the US and Japan, the only attempt to use penetrators - the Deep Space 2 vehicles aboard NASA's Mars Polar Lander - was unsuccessful. Penetrators could be used at Mars, to deploy a seismic network; at Europa in order to measure the thickness of the ice sheet; and at Enceladus to investigate the fissures discovered by Cassini.

Experimental tests of the penetrators have been carried out by the Mullard Space Science Laboratory and the QinetiQ company in 2008. The use of low-cost satellite technology in planetary exploration is a further goal of the mission.

== International collaboration ==
The American space agency NASA became interested in the project in 2007 during the work of a BNSC/NASA Joint Working Group on lunar exploration. NASA could have contributed various parts to the mission.

== Status ==
As of September 2018, no progress on the project had been announced, and the "MoonLITE" keyword did not appear in a search of the UK Space Agency's official web site.
