= Shioli (crater) =

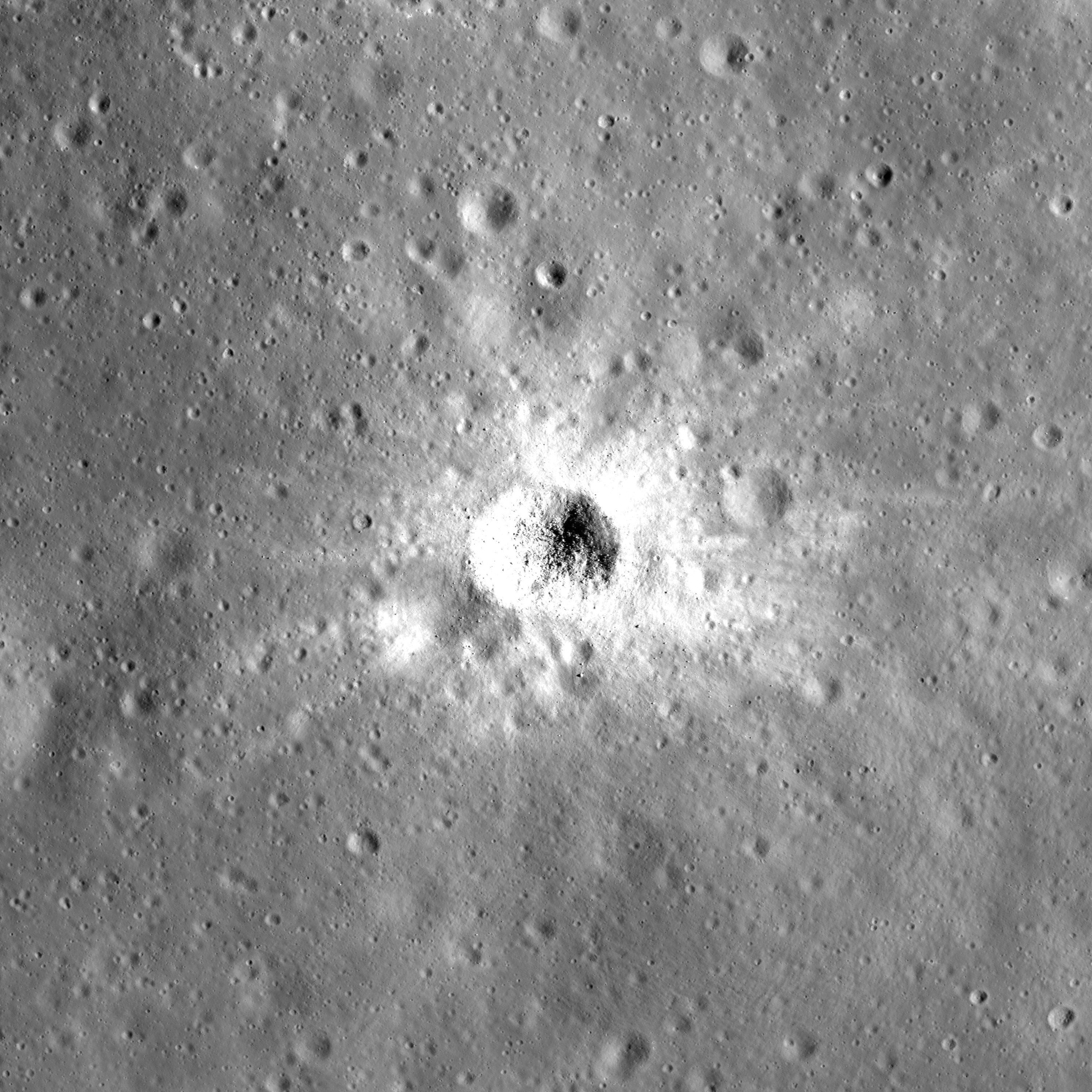
- LRO image
- Coordinates: 13.33°S 25.23°E
- Diameter: 270 m
- Depth: Unknown
- Eponym: Japanese female given name

Shioli is a small lunar impact crater that is located within the much larger Cyrillus crater on the near side of the Moon. It is a young crater with a prominent ray system.

== History ==
The crater's name, after the Japanese female given name, was approved by the IAU on 12 August 2019.

A point to the northwest of the crater was the landing site for the Japanese SLIM lander.

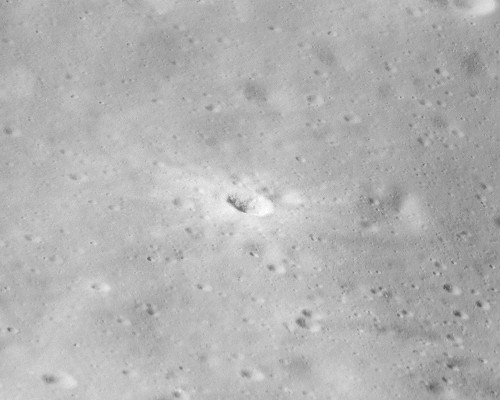
Oblique Apollo 16 image, looking south

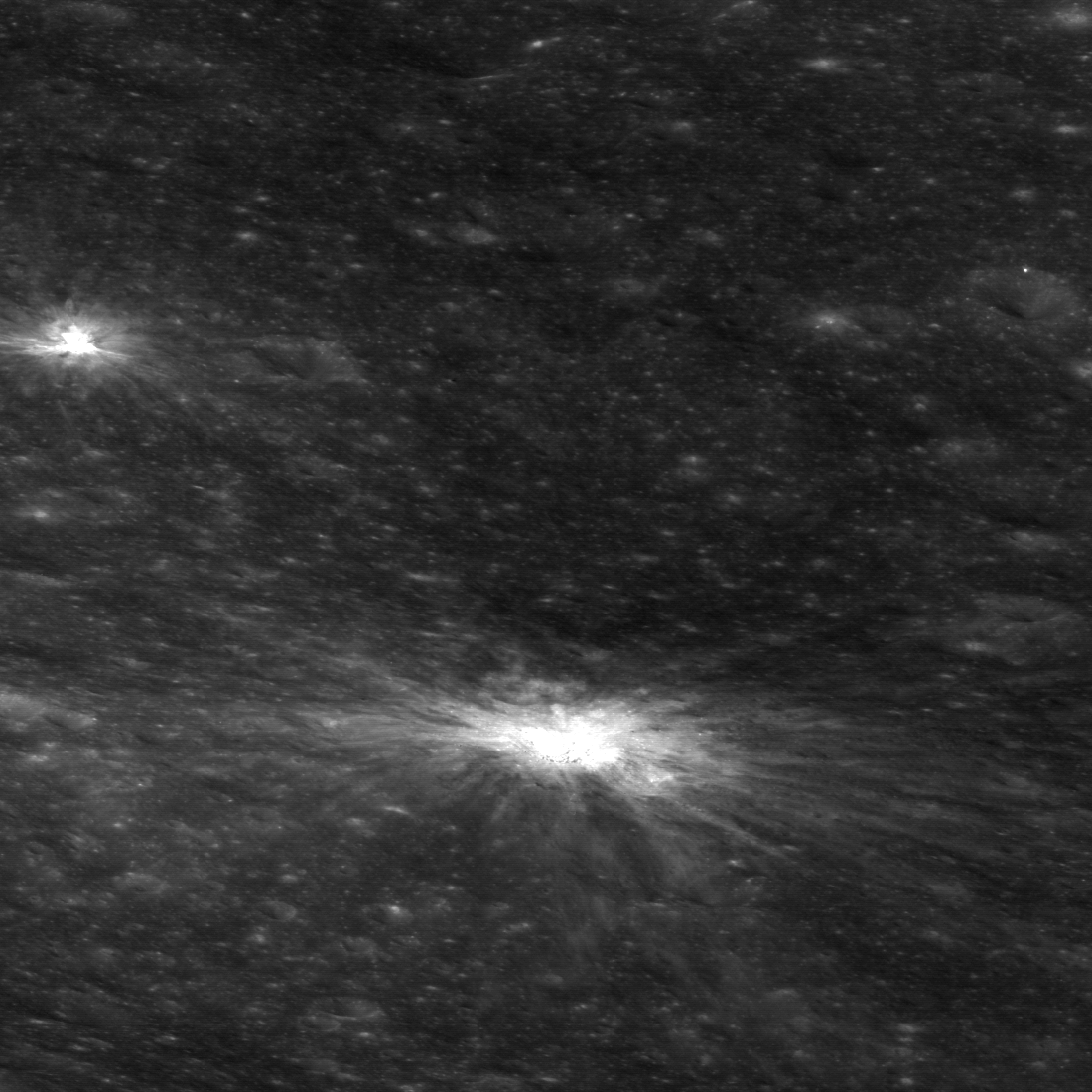
Another oblique view by LRO, looking east
