= Emirates Lunar Mission =

United Arab Emirates Lunar Mission

- مشروع الإمارات لاستكشاف القمر

Program overview
- Country: United Arab Emirates
- Organization: Mohammed bin Rashid Space Centre

Program history
- First flight: 11 December 2022
- Failures: 1

The Emirates Lunar Mission (Arabic: مشروع الإمارات لاستكشاف القمر) is the first program of missions to the Moon by the United Arab Emirates. It is a series of small lunar rovers all named Rashid.

== Rashid 1 ==
The mission by Mohammed bin Rashid Space Centre (MBRSC) sent a lunar rover named Rashid 1 to the Moon aboard ispace's Hakuto-R Mission 1 lander. It was launched on 11 December 2022 on a Falcon 9 Block 5 rocket, and the rover attempted to land in Atlas crater. On 25 April 2023, seconds before an attempted landing, communication with the Hakuto-R lander was lost. The ispace team confirmed that the spacecraft had crashed into the Moon and was thus destroyed.

== Rashid 2 ==
After the failed soft-landing of the lander carrying Rashid 1, the Emirates Lunar Mission conducted a study to select the lander that would host the Rashid 2 rover. Initial reporting in 2022 suggested it would be carried on Chang'e 7. On 22 May 2025, Firefly Aerospace announced its Blue Ghost Mission 2 lander would deliver Rashid 2 to the lunar surface.

== Rashid 3 ==
The Rashid 3 rover is expected to launch in 2029 and to explore the Lunar south pole region.
