= SELENE-2 =

Cancelled Japanese lunar exploration mission

- Mission type: Orbiter lander rover
- Operator: JAXA

Spacecraft properties
- Launch mass: 5,000 kg

Start of mission
- Launch date: Cancelled
- Rocket: H-IIA

Orbital parameters
- Reference system: Selenocentric

SELENE-2 /ˈsɛlɪniː/, or the Selenological and Engineering Explorer 2, is a cancelled Japanese robotic mission to the Moon that would have included an orbiter, a lander and a rover. It was intended as a successor to the 2007 SELENE (Kaguya) lunar orbiter.

Instead of SELENE-2, JAXA is working with the Indian Space Research Organisation (ISRO) to plan a joint mission called the Lunar Polar Exploration Mission (LUPEX). The mission would send an uncrewed lunar lander and rover to explore the south pole region of the Moon no earlier than 2026. JAXA is likely to provide the under-development H3 launch vehicle and the rover, while ISRO would be providing the lander.

== Overview ==
The lander would have targeted lava tubes and other permanently shadowed areas, which function as cold trap volatiles such as water. Water ice could be processed by future missions to produce spacecraft propellant (LOX/H_{2}).

Orbiter

The orbiter would have a mass of 700 kg.

Lander

The lander would have a mass of 1,000 kg, and would be able to deliver up to 340 kg of payload, including the rover. Its mission would last two weeks.

Rover

The rover would have a mass of 100 kg, and it would operate for two weeks.

== Penetrators ==
One option JAXA was investigating in 2006, was to integrate a small data relay satellite and penetrators into the mission.

== See also ==
- Hiten (MUSES-A)
- Lunar-A
- SELENE (Kaguya)
- Smart Lander for Investigating Moon (SLIM)
