= Mare Frigoris =

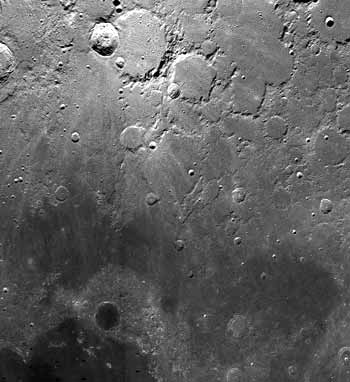
- Mare Frigoris is the dark grey material in the lower portion of this photo
- Coordinates: 56.0°N 1.4°E
- Diameter: 1,446 km (899 mi)
- Eponym: Sea of Cold

Mare Frigoris /frɪˈɡɔːrɪs/ (Latin frīgōris, the "Sea of Cold") is a lunar mare in the far north of the Moon. It is located in the outer rings of the Procellarum basin, just north of Mare Imbrium, and stretches east to north of Mare Serenitatis. It is just north of the dark crater Plato.

The basin material surrounding the mare is of the Lower Imbrian epoch, while the eastern mare material is of the Upper Imbrian epoch, and the western mare material is of the Eratosthenian epoch.

== Name ==
Like most of the other maria on the Moon, Mare Frigoris was named by Giovanni Riccioli, whose 1651 nomenclature system has become standardized. Previously, William Gilbert had included it among the Insula Borealis ("Northern Island") in his map of c.1600, and Michael van Langren had labelled it the Mare Astronomicum ("Sea of Astronomy") in his 1645 map. Pierre Gassendi called it the Boreum Mare ('Northern Sea').

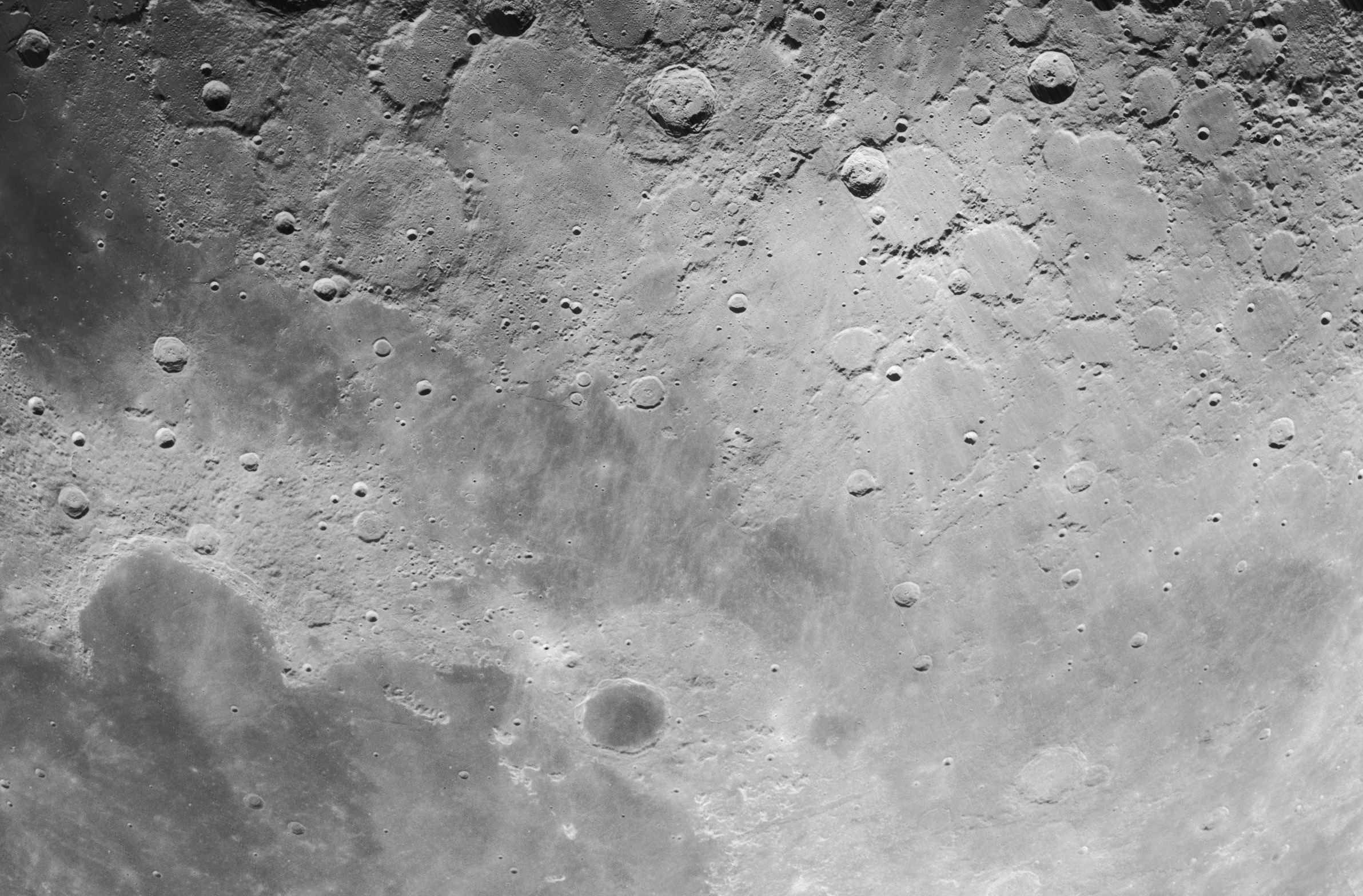
Lunar Orbiter 4 image of Mare Frigoris and vicinity. This regional view is nearly orthogonal at top but highly oblique at bottom, and north is up and slightly to the right. Mare Frigoris is the dark band extending from upper left to lower right. Mare Imbrium and Sinus Iridum are in lower left. Prominent craters include Plato with dark flat floor in bottom center, Harpalus near left edge within the mare, Philolaus at top center, and Aristoteles in lower right within the mare.

== Research ==
The second Hakuto-R mission from Japanese private spaceflight company ispace attempted to land at a Mare Frigoris site in June 2025 but failed.

== In popular culture ==
Mare Frigoris on a map of the lunar nearside with major maria and craters labelled.

This area of the Moon featured prominently in 'Behemoth', the second episode of the 1973 BBC science fiction mini-series Moonbase 3.

Mare Frigoris was intended to be the original landing site of the fictionalised version of Apollo 15 in the Apple TV+ series For All Mankind, although in the show the crew decided last minute to divert the landing to Shackleton crater in the Lunar south pole upon finding out there is a high concentration of water ice in the area (a discovery not made in reality until the 1990s).
