= Lunar day =

Time for Moon to complete one rotation on its axis

A full lunar day observed from the Earth, where orbital libration causes the apparent wobble.

A lunar day is the time it takes for Earth's Moon to complete on its axis one synodic rotation, meaning with respect to the Sun. The synodic period is about 29.53 Earth days, which is about 2.2 days longer than its sidereal period.

Informally, a lunar day and a lunar night are each approximately 14 Earth days. The formal lunar day is therefore the time of a full lunar day-night cycle.

Due to tidal locking, this equals the time that the Moon takes to complete one synodic orbit around Earth, a synodic lunar month. Because of this synchronicity, the cycle of lunar phases observed from Earth are the lunar day on the near side of the Moon.

== Main definition ==
Relative to the fixed stars on the celestial sphere, the Moon takes 27 Earth days, 7 hours, 43 minutes, 12 seconds to complete one orbit; however, since the Earth–Moon system advances around the Sun at the same time, the Moon must travel farther to return to the same phase. On average, this synodic period lasts 29 days, 12 hours, 44 minutes, 3 seconds, the length of a lunar month on Earth. The exact length varies over time because the speed of the Earth–Moon system around the Sun varies slightly during a year due to the eccentricity of its elliptical orbit, variances in orbital velocity, and a number of other periodic and evolving variations about its observed, relative, mean values, which are influenced by the gravitational perturbations of the Sun and other bodies in the Solar System.

As a result, daylight at a given point on the Moon lasts approximately two weeks from beginning to end, followed by approximately two weeks of lunar night.

== Darkness (lunar night) ==
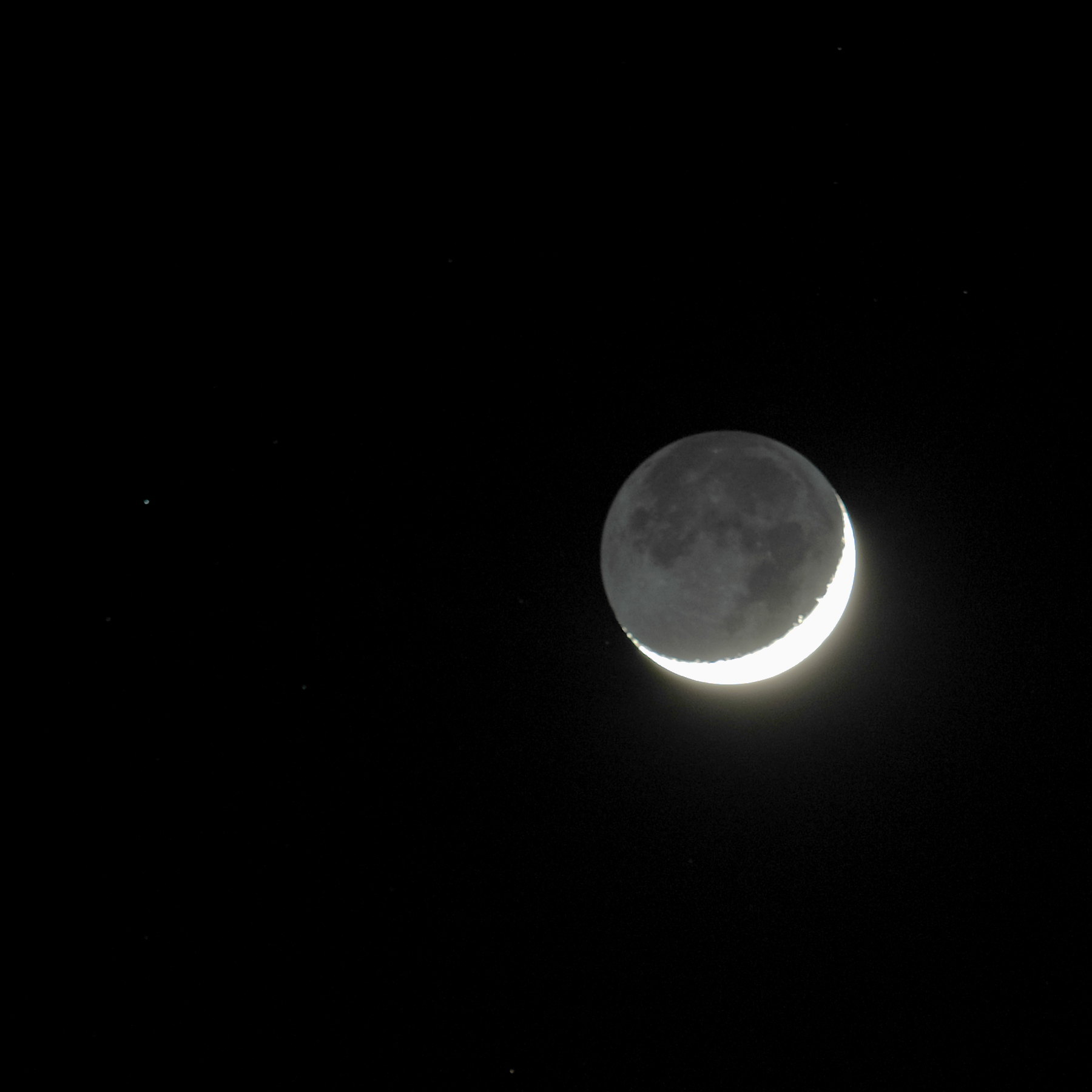
The night side of the Moon, illuminated by earthshine, becomes visible next to the narrow crescent (11 percent, age of the Moon = 3.3 days) with ash-grey moonlight.

Lunar night is the darkest on the far side (darker than a moonless night on Earth, due to the lack of atmospheric effects like airglow).

On the near side Earthshine makes the night about 43 times brighter, and sometimes even 55 times brighter than a night on Earth illuminated by the light of the full moon. Only during lunar eclipses the night is on the near side darker than on Earth.

No person has been on the Moon during its night and experienced earthshine.

== Alternate usage ==
- The term lunar day may also refer to the period between moonrises or high moon in a particular location on Earth. This period is typically about 50 minutes longer than a 24-hour Earth day, as the Moon orbits the Earth in the same direction as the Earth's axial rotation.
- The term lunar day is also used in the context of night and day, i.e., opposite to the lunar night. This is common in discussions of the huge difference in temperatures, such as discussion about lunar rovers. For example, "the Soviet Union's Luna missions [...] were designed to survive one lunar day (two Earth weeks)", while China's Yutu-2 rover, which landed in January 2019, was designed to survive lunar nights by shutting down.

=== Lunar calendars ===
In some lunar calendars, such as the Vikram Samvat, a lunar day, or tithi, is defined as 1/30 of a lunar month, or the time it takes for the longitudinal angle between the Moon and the Sun to increase by 12 degrees. By this definition, lunar days generally vary in duration.

== See also ==
- Lunisolar calendar
- Mars sol, the Martian day
- Synodic day
