= Phootprint =

Proposed sample-return mission to Phobos

- Names: Phobos Sample Return Mission
- Mission type: Technology demonstrattor, sample return
- Operator: European Space Agency
- Mission duration: 3.5 years (planned)

Spacecraft properties
- Manufacturer: Airbus Defence and Space
- Launch mass: 4,200 kg (9,300 lb)

Start of mission
- Launch date: 2024 (proposed)
- Rocket: Ariane 5
- Launch site: Guiana Space Centre

End of mission
- Disposal: Re-entry capsule
- Landing date: ~2027

Orbital parameters
- Reference system: Mars
- Phobos

Phobos lander
- Sample mass: 800 g; return about 100 g (0.22 lb)

Phootprint was a feasibility study conducted in 2014 by the European Space Agency (ESA) for a sample-return mission to the Mars moon Phobos. The study proposed a launch date of 2024 for this mission. The ESA ultimately did not launch Phootprint as its own mission but is working with the Japan Aerospace Exploration Agency (JAXA) on the Martian Moons eXploration (MMX) probe, a similar mission to Phobos set to launch in 2026.

== Overview and status ==
The Phootprint mission was conceived as a candidate for the Mars Robotic Exploration Preparation Programme 2 (MREP-2) at ESA. In 2014, ESA funded Footprint's pre-phase A feasibility study and an 8-month industrial system study.

The mission was proposed to be launched on an Ariane 5 in 2024 with early 2026 as backup date. The spacecraft would have orbited Mars for the characterisation phase, before maneuvering into a quasi-satellite orbit to facilitate the landing on Phobos. Because of the low gravity, the lander would have anchored itself to the surface during sample collection and when launching the Earth Re-entry Capsule (ERC).

The mission would have lasted about 3.5 years, including the cruise time to Phobos, orbit mapping, 7 days on the surface, and finally, the sample return cruise time. The spacecraft would be powered by solar arrays.

In August 2015, the ESA-Roscosmos working group, after cooperation on ExoMars, completed a joint study for a possible future Phobos Sample Return mission, and preliminary discussions were held.

Ultimately, Phootprint was not pursued as an ESA-headed mission under that name. However, interest in a sample-return mission to Phobos remained to further the objectives of the ESA's Cosmic Vision campaign, and the ESA became a contributor to the Japanese MMX mission.

== Objectives ==
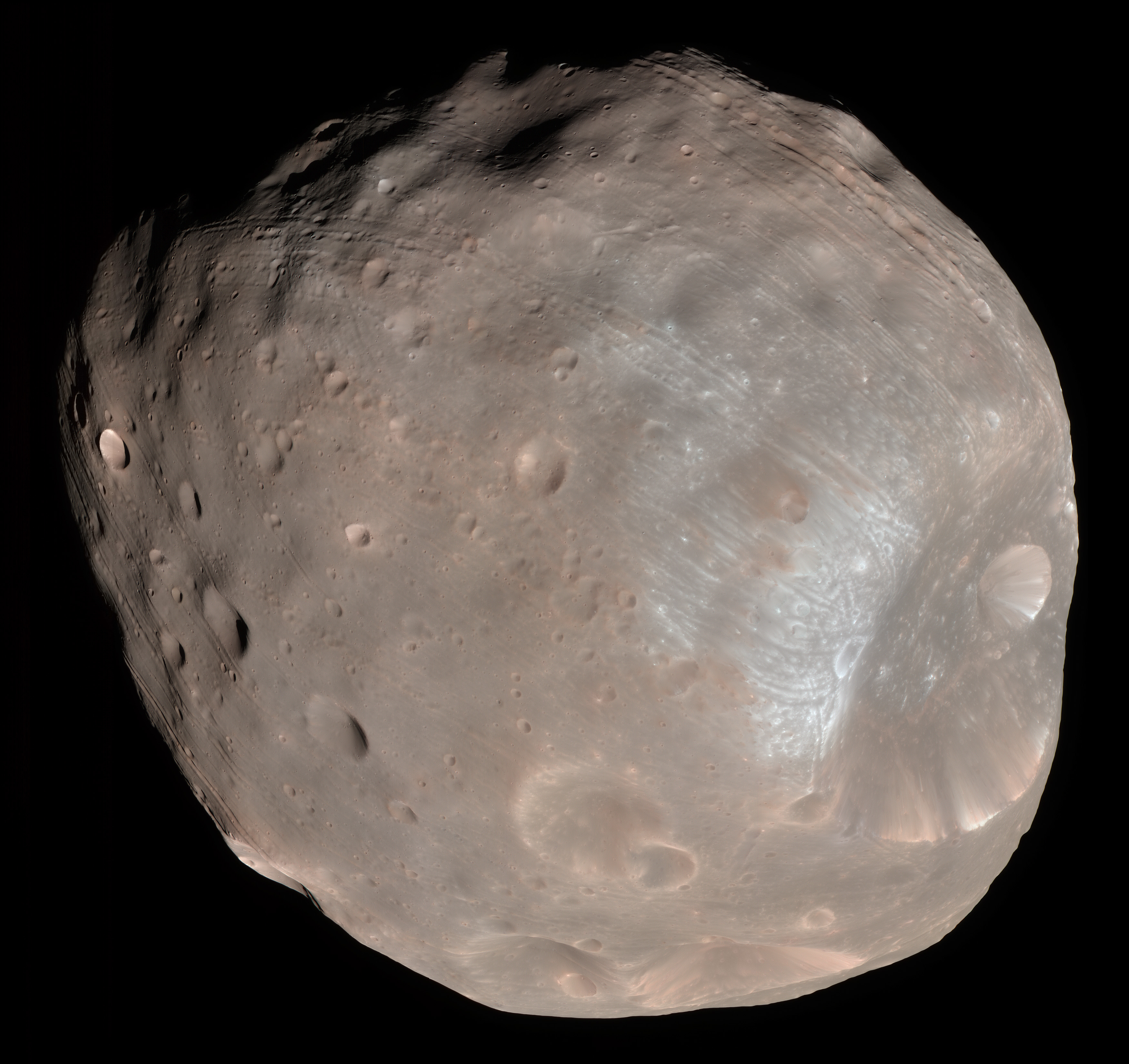
Phobos, one of the two moons of Mars

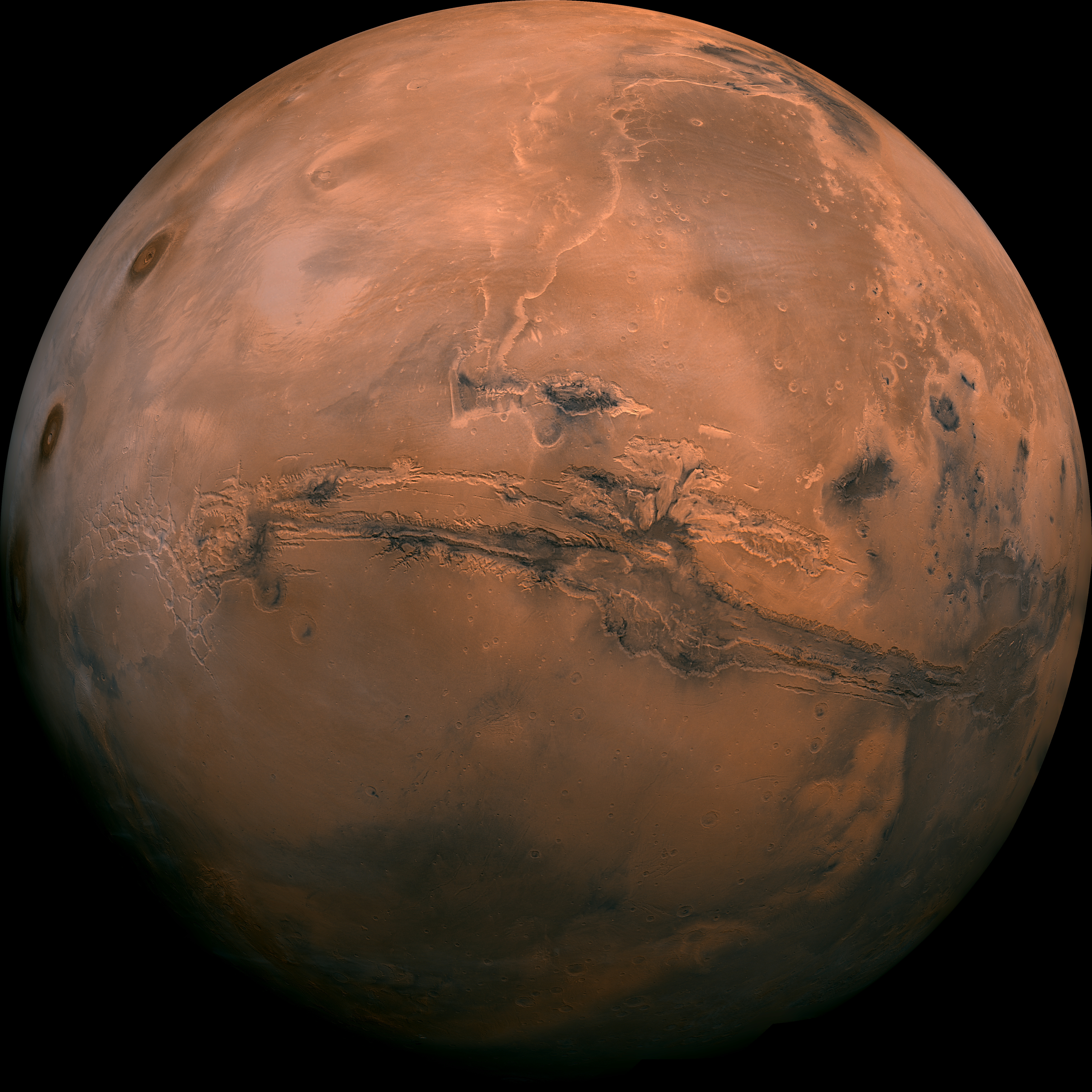
Parent body, the planet Mars

The top-level science goal was to understand the formation of the Martian moons Phobos and Deimos and put constraints on the evolution of the Solar System (co-formation, capture, impact ejecta).

The mission objectives were:

- Return 100 grams (g) of loose material from the surface of Phobos.
- Access at least 50% of the Phobos surface for the sampling operations.
- Landing site selected by Science Team during mission post extensive global and local mapping campaign
- Strict requirements on surface contamination
- Goal of 800 g load on sample (return approximately 100 g (0.22 lb))
- Static landing with 100 m (330 ft) landing accuracy

"No rebound" after landing was a critical condition given the low-gravity environment of Phobos. To address this, the feasibility study recommended four cantilever-type landing legs with crushable aluminum honeycomb shock absorbers and secondary load limiters.

== Spacecraft ==
The concept of the Phootprint spacecraft was composed of three modules:

- The Landing Module (LM) carrying the ERV & ERC, performing the transfer to Mars, the Mars orbit insertion and phasing maneuvers to reach Phobos vicinity, the operations around and on Phobos, including landing and sampling. The landing module would be equipped with a 2 m (6 ft 7 in) sampling robotic arm.
- The Earth Return Vehicle (ERV) performing the Mars escape, the transfer back to Earth and the ERC release a few hours before re-entry.
- The Earth Re-entry Capsule (ERC) — a fully passive module: ballistic re-entry with no parachute, hard landing on the ground with maximum impact deceleration of 1700 g to the sample. Modeling of the thermal design indicates the sample container temperature during reentry would be less than 40 °C (104 °F). A location beacon would be included within sample container.

=== Proposed payload ===
The conceptual 30 kg (66.1 lb) payload was:

- Wide angle camera
- Narrow angle camera
- Close-up camera
- Context camera for sampling context
- Visible-IR spectrometer
- Infrared spectrometer
- A radio science module

== Mission architecture ==
The proposed mission architecture was:

1. Ariane 5 launch from Kourou in direct escape
2. Transfer to Mars (11 months)
3. Nine months orbiting Phobos/Mars dedicated to science observations and sampling (7 days on the surface)
4. Departure from Mars to Earth (8 months)

== See also ==
- Fobos Grunt – 2011 Russian attempted sample-return mission to the Martian moon Phobos
- List of missions to Mars
- Phobos And Deimos & Mars Environment – NASA Mars orbiter mission concept
- Phobos program – 1988 Soviet missions to Mars
- Phobos Surveyor – Proposed Phobos orbiter
