= Lunar lander =

Spacecraft intended to land on the surface of the Moon

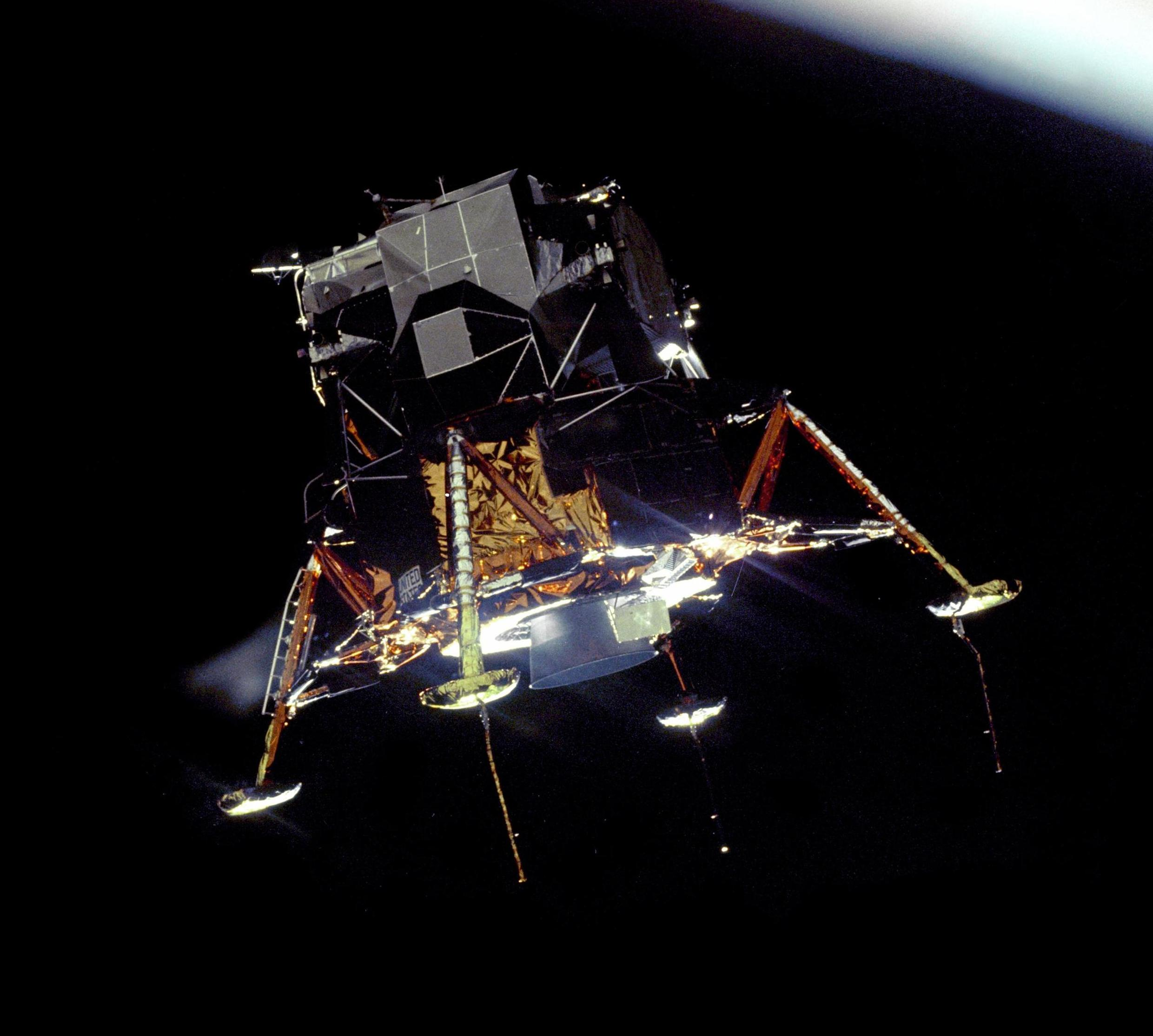
Apollo Lunar Module Eagle as seen from Apollo command and service module Columbia during the 1969 Apollo 11 mission

A lunar lander or Moon lander is a spacecraft designed to land on the surface of the Moon. As of 2024, the Apollo Lunar Module is the only lunar lander to have ever been used in human spaceflight, completing six lunar landings from 1969 to 1972 during the United States' Apollo Program. Several robotic landers have reached the surface, and some have returned samples to Earth.

The design requirements for these landers depend on factors imposed by the payload, flight rate, propulsive requirements, and configuration constraints. Other important design factors include overall energy requirements, mission duration, the type of mission operations on the lunar surface, and life support system if crewed. The relatively high gravity (higher than all known asteroids, but lower than all Solar System planets) and lack of lunar atmosphere negates the use of aerobraking, so a lander must use propulsion to decelerate and achieve a soft landing.

== History ==
=== 1958–1976 ===
The Luna program was a series of robotic impactors, flybys, orbiters, and landers flown by the Soviet Union between 1958 and 1976. Luna 9 was the first spacecraft to achieve a soft landing on the Moon on February 3, 1966, after 11 unsuccessful attempts. Three Luna Spacecraft returned lunar soil samples to Earth from 1972 to 1976. Two other Luna spacecraft soft-landed the Lunokhod robotic lunar rover in 1970 and 1973. Luna achieved a total of seven successful soft-landings out of 27 landing attempts.

The United States' Surveyor program first soft-landed Surveyor 1 on June 2, 1966, this initial success was followed by four additional successful soft-landings, the last occurring on January 10, 1968. The Surveyor program achieved a total of five successful soft landings out of seven landing attempts through January 10, 1968. Surveyor 6 even did a brief hop off the lunar surface.

The Apollo Lunar Module was the lunar lander for the United States' Apollo program. As of 2025, it is the only crewed lunar lander. The Apollo program completed six successful lunar soft-landings from 1969 until 1972; a seventh lunar landing attempt by the Apollo program was aborted when Apollo 13's service module suffered explosive venting from its oxygen tanks.

The LK lunar module was the lunar lander developed by the Soviet Union as a part of several Soviet crewed lunar programs. Several LK lunar modules were flown without crew in low Earth orbit, but the LK lunar module never flew to the Moon, as the development of the N1 Rocket Launch Vehicle required for the lunar flight suffered setbacks (including several launch failures), and after the first human Moon landings were achieved by the United States, the Soviet Union cancelled both the N1 Rocket and the LK Lunar Module programs without any further development.

=== 2013–2023 ===
The Chinese Lunar Exploration Program (also known as the Chang'e project) includes robotic lander, rover, and sample-return components; the program realized an initial successful lunar soft-landing with the Chang'e 3 spacecraft on 14 December 2013. As of 2023, the CLEP has achieved three successful soft-landings out of three landing attempts, namely Chang'e 3, Chang'e 4 and Chang'e 5. Chang'e 4 made history by making humanity's first ever soft-landing on the far side of the Moon.

Israel's SpaceIL attempted a robotic lunar landing by its Beresheet lander on 4 April 2019; the attempt failed. As of 2023, SpaceIL has plans for another soft-landing attempt using a follow-up robotic lander named Beresheet 2.

India's Chandrayaan Programme conducted an unsuccessful robotic lunar soft-landing attempt on 6 September 2019 as part of its Chandrayaan-2 spacecraft with the lander crashing on the Moon's surface. On 23 August 2023, the program's follow-up Chandrayaan-3 lander achieved India's first robotic soft-landing and later conducted a brief hop on 3 September 2023 to test technologies required for Indian lunar sample return mission called Chandrayaan-4.

Japan's ispace (not to be confused with China's i-Space) attempted a lunar soft-landing by its Hakuto-R Mission 1 robotic lander on 25 April 2023. The attempt was unsuccessful and the lander crashed into the lunar surface. The company attempted another landing attempt in 2025, but that also failed.

Russia's Luna-Glob program, the successor program to the Soviet Union's Luna program, launched the Luna 25 lunar lander on 10 August 2023; the probe's intended destination was near the lunar south pole, but on 19 August 2023 the lander crashed on the Moon's surface.

Japan's Smart Lander for Investigating Moon made a successful lunar landing with wrong attitude, bleak signal bandwidth and even after losing one of its engines during descent but within 100 m (330 ft) of its landing spot on 19 January 2024. It carried two small LEV rovers on board deployed separately, just before SLIM's touchdown. Its landing made Japan the 5th country to soft land on the Moon.

=== 2024 ===
In January 2024, the first mission of the NASA-funded CLPS program, Peregrine Mission One, suffered a fuel leak several hours after launch, resulting in losing the ability to maintain attitude control and charge its battery, thereby preventing it from reaching lunar orbit and precluding a landing attempt. The probe subsequently burnt up in Earth's atmosphere.

The second CLPS probe Odysseus landed successfully on 22 February 2024 on the Moon, marking the United States' first unmanned lunar soft-landing in over 50 years. This mission is the first private-NASA partnership to land on the Moon and the first landing using cryogenic propellants. However, the mission experienced some anomalies, including tipping-over on one side on the lunar surface; an off-nominal initial lunar orbit, a non-functioning landing LIDAR instrument, and apparently low communication bandwidth. Later it was revealed that, though it landed successfully, one of the lander's legs broke upon landing and it tilted up on other side, 18° due to landing on a slope, but the lander survived and payloads are functioning as expected. EagleCam was not ejected prior to landing. It was later ejected on 28 February but partially failed as it returned all types of data, except post IM-1 landing images, the main aim of its mission.

China launched Chang'e 6 from China's Hainan Island on 3 May 2024; this mission seeks to conduct the first lunar sample return from the far side of the Moon. This is China's second lunar sample return mission, the first was successfully completed by Chang'e 5 when it returned 1.731 kg of lunar near side material to the Earth on 16 December 2020. The Chang'e 6 lander successfully landed in the South pole-Aitken basin on the lunar far side at 22:23 UTC on 1 June 2024. After the completion of sample collection and the placement of the sample on the ascender by the probe's robotic drill and robotic arm, the ascender successfully took off from atop the lander portion of the probe at 23:38 UTC on 3 June 2024. The ascender docked with the Chang'e 6 service module (the orbiter) in lunar orbit at 06:48 UTC on 6 June 2024 and subsequently completed the transfer of the sample container to the Earth rentry module at 07:24 UTC on the same day. The orbiter then left lunar orbit on 20 June 2024 with the returner, which landed in Inner Mongolia on 25 June 2024, completing China's lunar far side sample return mission.

=== 2025 ===
Firefly Aerospace's lunar lander Blue Ghost Mission 1, carrying NASA-sponsored experiments and commercial payloads as a part of Commercial Lunar Payload Services program to Mare Crisium, was launched on 15 January 2025 on a Falcon 9 launch vehicle with Hakuto-R Mission 2 and successfully landed on 2 March 2025.

The second mission of the Hakuto-R program by ispace, Hakuto-R Mission 2, carrying the RESILIENCE lunar lander and TENACIOUS micro rover, was launched on 15 January 2025 on a Falcon 9 launch vehicle with the Blue Ghost M1 lander. Its landing attempt in Mare Frigoris on 5 June 2025 failed, and the lander crashed into the lunar surface. NASA's Lunar Reconnaissance Orbiter later photographed the crash site. On 24 June 2025, ispace attributed the crash to the lander's laser range finder, which was slow to start measuring the distance to the surface.

Intuitive Machines's lunar lander IM-2, carrying NASA-sponsored experiments and commercial rovers (Yaoki, AstroAnt, Micro-Nova and MAPP LV1) and payloads as a part of Commercial Lunar Payload Services program to Mons Mouton, was launched on 27 February 2025 on a Falcon 9 launch vehicle with Brokkr-2 and Lunar Trailblazer. IM-2 landed on 6 March 2025. The spacecraft was intact after touchdown but resting on its side, thereby complicating its planned science and technology demonstration mission; this outcome is similar to what occurred with the company's IM-1 Odysseus spacecraft in 2024. On March 13, Intuitive Machines shared that, like on the IM-1 mission, the Athena's altimeter had failed during landing, leaving its onboard computer without an accurate altitude reading. As a result, the spacecraft struck a plateau, tipped over, and skidded across the lunar surface, rolling once or twice before settling inside the crater. The company's CEO compared it to a baseball player sliding into a base. During the slide, the spacecraft rolled once or twice, before coming to rest inside the crater. The impact also kicked up regolith that coated the solar panels in dust, further degrading their performance.

== Landing outcomes ==
The following table details the success rates of past and on-going lunar soft-landing attempts by robotic and crewed lunar-landing programs. Landing programs which have not launched any probes are not included in the table; they are added as their initial robotic and/or crewed landers are launched from Earth.

The term landing attempt as used here includes any mission that was launched with the intent to land on the Moon, including all missions which failed to reach lunar orbit for any reason. A landing attempt by a spacecraft is classified as full success if it lands intact on the Moon and is situated in its designed orientation/attitude and fully functional, while a partial success occurs when a spacecraft lands intact on the Moon but its in-situ operations is compromised as a result of the landing process for any reason; a failure occurs when neither full success nor partial success has been achieved by the spacecraft.

Program	Country/Orgs.	Time-span (Note: "Time-span" in this case begins in the year that the relevant program launched its first lunar landing attempt.)	Type	Landing attempts	Full success	Partial success	Failure	Notes
Luna	(Soviet Union) USSR	1963–1976	robotic	27	7		20	Luna 25 is part of Luna-Glob
Surveyor	(United States) NASA	1966–1968	robotic	7	5		2	
Apollo	(United States) NASA	1969–1972	crewed	7	6		1	
N1/L3	(Soviet Union) USSR	N/A	crewed	0	0			3 uncrewed T2K LK landers were tested in Earth orbit
Chang'e	(China) CNSA	2013–present	robotic	4	4			Landers/rovers, sample-returns Chang'e 6 landed on the far side of the Moon on 1 June 2024 and successfully returned samples to Earth
Beresheet	(Israel) SpaceIL	2019–present	robotic	1	0		1	
Chandrayaan	(India) ISRO	2019–present	robotic	2	1		1	
Hakuto-R	(Japan) ispace	2022–present	robotic	2	0		2	Hakuto-R mission 2 landing attempt failed on 5 June 2025
Luna-Glob	(Russia) Roscosmos	2023–present	robotic	1	0		1	Successor to the Soviet Luna programme
JAXA	(Japan) JAXA	2023–present	robotic	1	0	1		SLIM landed with off-nominal attitude
CLPS	(United States) NASA	2024–present	robotic	4	1	2	1	Blue Ghost landed successfully on 2 March 2025; IM-2 landed on 6 March 2025 but tipped over

== Proposed landers and research craft ==
=== Uncrewed ===
- ESA Argonaut
- Under the Luna-Glob program of lunar exploration undertaken by the Russian Federal Space Agency
  - Luna 27 "Luna-Resurs 1" – lunar south pole lander
  - Luna 28 "Luna-Resurs 2" – lunar south pole lander and sample return
- Blue Moon Mark 1, from Blue Origin
- Under NASA's Lunar CATALYST program and eligible to bid on Commercial Lunar Payload Services contracts to support NASA's crewed Artemis Program:
  - XL-1 and XEUS from Masten Space Systems and United Launch Alliance (XEUS was dual use as crewed, but cancelled)
  - Griffin Lander from Astrobotic Technology
  - MX-1 from Moon Express
- Under Chandrayaan programme by ISRO
  - Chandrayaan-4 lander
  - LUPEX lander

=== Crewed ===
- Altair, a proposed spacecraft for the Constellation program, previously known as the Lunar Surface Access Module
- Under NASA's Artemis program, multiple vendors were selected to supply spacecraft for the Human Landing System role:
  - Starship HLS, lunar variant of SpaceX Starship, chosen as the first HLS vendor
  - Blue Moon Mark 2, chosen as the second HLS vendor (Blue Origin)
  - Integrated Lander Vehicle, not selected (Blue Origin, Lockheed Martin, Northrop Grumman and Draper Laboratory)
  - Lockheed Martin Lunar Lander and Mars Precursor, based on Orion technology; partially incorporated into the Integrated Lander Vehicle
  - Boeing Lunar Lander, not selected
- As part of the crewed mission phase of its Chinese Lunar Exploration Program, China has introduced a staged-descent concept for a crewed lunar landing attempt by 2030. The staged-descent concept would use a propulsion stage to handle most of the deceleration, after which the lander segment would separate and complete the powered descent with a soft-landing on the Moon; the lander would also serve as the ascent vehicle.

=== Research craft (earthbound) ===
- Several were produced for the Lunar Lander Challenge, a competition to produce VTVL vehicles with sufficient delta-v to fly from the Moon to orbit
- Mighty Eagle lander
- Morpheus Lander, part of NASA's Project Morpheus (results used for Lunar CATALYST)

== Challenges unique to lunar landing ==
Landing on any Solar System body comes with challenges unique to that body. The Moon has relatively high gravity compared to that of asteroids or comets—and some other planetary satellites—and no significant atmosphere. Practically, this means that the only method of descent and landing that can provide sufficient thrust with current technology is based on chemical rockets. In addition, the Moon has a long solar day. Landers will be in direct sunlight for more than two weeks at a time, and then in complete darkness for another two weeks. This causes significant problems for thermal control.

=== Lack of atmosphere ===
As of 2019, space probes have landed on all three bodies other than Earth that have solid surfaces and atmospheres thick enough to make aerobraking possible: Mars, Venus, and Saturn's moon Titan. These probes were able to leverage the atmospheres of the bodies on which they landed to slow their descent using parachutes, reducing the amount of fuel they were required to carry. This in turn allowed larger payloads to be landed on these bodies for a given amount of fuel. For example, the 900-kg Curiosity rover was landed on Mars by a craft having a mass (at the time of Mars atmospheric entry) of 2400 kg, of which only 390 kg was fuel. In comparison, the much lighter (292 kg) Surveyor 3 landed on the Moon in 1967 using nearly 700 kg of fuel. The lack of an atmosphere, however, removes the need for a Moon lander to have a heat shield and also allows aerodynamics to be disregarded when designing the craft.

=== High gravity ===
Although it has much less gravity than Earth, the Moon has sufficiently high gravity that descent must be slowed considerably. This is in contrast to a small asteroid, in which "landing" is more often called "docking" and is a matter of rendezvous and matching velocity more than slowing a rapid descent.

Since rocketry is used for descent and landing, the Moon's gravity necessitates the use of more fuel than is needed for asteroid landing. Indeed, one of the central design constraints for the Apollo program's Moon landing was mass (as more mass requires more fuel to land) required to land and take off from the Moon.

=== Thermal environment ===
The lunar thermal environment is influenced by the length of the lunar day. Temperatures can swing between approximately −250 to 120 °C (−418.0 to 248.0 °F) (lunar night to lunar day). These extremes occur for fourteen Earth days each, so thermal control systems must be designed to handle long periods of extreme cold or heat. Most spacecraft instruments must be kept within a much stricter range of between −40 and 50 °C (−40 and 122 °F), and human comfort requires a range of 20 to 24 °C (68 to 75 °F). This means that the lander must cool and heat its instruments or crew compartment.

The length of the lunar night makes it difficult to use solar electric power to heat the instruments, and nuclear heaters are often used.

== Landing stages ==
Achieving a soft landing is the overarching goal of any lunar lander, and distinguishes landers from impactors, which were the first type of spacecraft to reach the surface of the Moon.

All lunar landers require rocket engines for descent. Orbital speed around the Moon can, depending on altitude, exceed 1500 m/s. Spacecraft on impact trajectories can have speeds well in excess of that. In the vacuum the only way to decelerate from that speed is to use a rocket engine.

The stages of landing can include:

1. Descent orbit insertion – the spacecraft enters an orbit favorable for final descent. This stage was not present in the early landing efforts, which did not begin with lunar orbit. Such missions began on a lunar impact trajectory instead.
2. Descent and braking – the spacecraft fires its engines until it is no longer in orbit. If the engines were to stop firing entirely at this stage the spacecraft would eventually impact the surface. During this stage, the spacecraft uses its rocket engine to reduce overall speed
3. Final approach – The spacecraft is nearly at the landing site, and final adjustments for the exact location of touchdown can be made
4. Touchdown – the spacecraft achieves soft landing on the Moon

=== Touchdown ===
Lunar landings typically end with the engine shutting down when the lander is several feet above the lunar surface. The idea is that engine exhaust and lunar regolith can cause problems if they were to be kicked back from the surface to the spacecraft, and thus the engines cut off just before touchdown. Engineers must ensure that the vehicle is protected enough to ensure that the fall without thrust does not cause damage.

The first soft lunar landing, performed by the Soviet Luna 9 probe, was achieved by first slowing the spacecraft to a suitable speed and altitude, then ejecting a payload containing the scientific experiments. The payload was stopped on the lunar surface using airbags, which provided cushioning as it fell. Luna 13 used a similar method.

Airbag methods are not typical. For example, NASA's Surveyor 1 probe, launched around the same time as Luna 9, did not use an airbag for final touchdown. Instead, after it arrested its velocity at an altitude of 3.4m it simply fell to the lunar surface. To accommodate the fall the spacecraft was equipped with crushable components that would soften the blow and keep the payload safe. More recently, the Chinese Chang'e 3 lander used a similar technique, falling 4m after its engine shut down.

Perhaps the most famous lunar landers, those of the Apollo Program, were robust enough to handle the drop once their contact probes detected that landing was imminent. The landing gear was designed to withstand landings with engine cut-out at up to 10 feet (3.0 m) of height, though it was intended for descent engine shutdown to commence when one of the 67-inch (170 cm) probes touched the surface. During Apollo 11 Neil Armstrong however touched down very gently by firing the engine until touchdown; some later crews shut down the engine before touchdown and felt noticeable bumps on landing, with greater compression of the landing struts.

== See also ==
- List of artificial objects on the Moon, a list of objects that have been left, landed, or crashed on the Moon
- List of crewed lunar lander designs
- Lunar module
- Lunar Terrain Vehicle
