= Xaero =

Xaero may refer to:

- Xaero, a reusable launch vehicle by Masten Space Systems
- Xaero, a fictional entity in Quake III Arena
