= Powerset (company) =

American search engine company

- Founded: San Francisco, U.S. (2005)
- Headquarters: San Francisco, California, U.S.
- Parent: Microsoft (as of August 1, 2008)

Powerset was an American company based in San Francisco, California, that, in 2006, was developing a natural language search engine for the Internet. On July 1, 2008, Powerset was acquired by Microsoft for an estimated $100 million (~$143 million in 2024).

Powerset was working on building a natural language search engine that could find targeted answers to user questions (as opposed to keyword based search). For example, when confronted with a question like "Which U.S. state has the highest income tax?", conventional search engines ignore the question phrasing and instead do a search on the keywords "state", "highest", "income", and "tax". Powerset on the other hand, attempts to use natural language processing to understand the nature of the question and return pages containing the answer.

The company was in the process of "building a natural language search engine that reads and understands every sentence on the Web". The company has licensed natural language technology from PARC, the former Xerox Palo Alto Research Center.

On May 11, 2008, the company unveiled a tool for searching a fixed subset of English Wikipedia using conversational phrases rather than keywords.

== Powerlabs ==
In a form of beta testing, Powerset opened an online community called Powerlabs on September 17, 2007. Business Week said: "The company hopes the site will marshal thousands of people to help build and improve its search engine before it goes public next year." Said The New York Times: "[Powerset Labs] goes far beyond the 'alpha' or 'beta' testing involved in most software projects, when users put a new product through rigorous testing to find its flaws. Powerset doesn’t have a product yet, but rather a collection of promising natural language technologies, which are the fruit of years of research at Xerox PARC."

Powerlabs' initial search results are taken from Wikipedia.

== Notable people ==
Barney Pell (born March 18, 1968, in Hollywood, California) was co-founder and CEO of Powerset. Pell received his Bachelor of Science degree in symbolic systems from Stanford University in 1989, where he graduated Phi Beta Kappa and was a National Merit Scholar. Pell received a PhD in computer science from Cambridge University in 1993, where he was a Marshall Scholar. He has worked at NASA, as chief strategist and vice president of business development at StockMaster.com (acquired by Red Herring in March, 2000) and at Whizbang! Labs. Prior to joining Powerset, Pell was an Entrepreneur-in-Residence at Mayfield Fund, a venture capital firm in Silicon Valley. Pell is also a founder of Moon Express, Inc., a U.S. company awarded a $10M commercial lunar contract by NASA and a competitor in the Google Lunar X PRIZE.

Steve Newcomb was the COO and co-founder of Powerset. Prior to joining Powerset, he was a co-founder of Loudfire, General Manager at Promptu, and was on the board of directors at Jaxtr. He left Powerset in October 2007 to form Virgance, a social startup incubator.

Lorenzo Thione (born in Como, Italy) was the product architect and co-founder of Powerset. Prior to joining Powerset, he worked at FXPAL in natural language processing and related research fields. Thione earned his master's degree in software engineering from the University of Texas at Austin.

Ronald Kaplan, former manager of research in Natural Language Theory and Technology at PARC, served as the company's CTO and CSO.

Ryan Ferrier is a member of the founding team of Powerset. He managed personnel and internal operations. After 2008 he went on to co-found Serious Business, which made Facebook applications and was later bought by Zynga.

Another Powerset alumnus, Alex Le, became CTO of Serious Business and went on to become an executive producer at Zynga when it bought the company. Siqi Chen founded a stealth startup in mobile computing after leaving Powerset.

Tom Preston-Werner worked at Powerset and left after the acquisition to found GitHub.

== Investors ==
Powerset attracted a wide range of investors, many of whom had considerable experience in the venture capital field. The company received $12.5 million (~$18.2 million in 2024) in Series A funding during November 2007, co-led by the venture capital firms Foundation Capital and The Founders Fund.

Among the better-known investors:

- Esther Dyson, founding chairman of ICANN, founder of the newsletter Release 1.0 and editor at Cnet
- Peter Thiel, founder and former CEO of PayPal
- Luke Nosek, founder of PayPal
- Todd Parker. Managing Partner, Hidden River Ventures
- Reid Hoffman, executive vice president of PayPal and founder of LinkedIn
- First Round Capital, seed-stage venture firm

== See also ==
- Bing (search engine)
- Apache HBase
