= Von Braun Center for Science & Innovation =

The Von Braun Center for Science & Innovation (VCSI) is a nonprofit research and development organization based in Huntsville, Alabama and is named for pioneering aerospace engineer Wernher von Braun. VCSI is affiliated with NASA, United States Department of Defense and other federal government agencies.

The center facilitates transfer of intellectual property between government agencies and private companies, also known as "spinoff" technologies. The center has also coordinated university research and development efforts in the Gulf of Mexico on behalf of NOAA

VCSI is a contributor to the Rocket City Space Pioneers efforts towards the Google Lunar X Prize.

== Members ==
=== Corporate ===
- Dynetics
- AZ Technology
- Science Applications International Corporation (SAIC)
- Alliant Techsystems
- Gray Research
- Lockheed Martin
- Polaris Sensor Technologies
- Sirote & Permutt
- Beason & Nalley
- Draper Laboratory

=== Government ===
- Aviation and Missile Research, Development, and Engineering Center
- NASA
- Missile Defense Agency
- Tennessee Valley Authority

=== University ===
- Alabama A&M University
- Auburn University
- Tuskegee University
- University of Alabama
  - University of Alabama at Birmingham
  - University of Alabama in Huntsville
- University of South Alabama
