= Lunar CATALYST =

Lunar Cargo Transportation and Landing by Soft Touchdown (Lunar CATALYST)
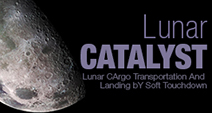
- Mission statement: "NASA's Lunar Cargo Transportation and Landing by Soft Touchdown (Lunar CATALYST) initiative is establishing multiple no-funds-exchanged Space Act Agreement (SAA) partnerships with U.S. private sector entities. The purpose of these SAAs is to encourage the development of robotic lunar landers that can be integrated with U.S. commercial launch capabilities to deliver payloads to the lunar surface."
- Commercial?: Yes
- Type of project: Initiative
- Location: USA
- Owner: NASA/Goddard Space Flight Center
- Established: July 2013
- Website: www.nasa.gov/lunarcatalyst

The Lunar CATALYST (Lunar Cargo Transportation and Landing by Soft Touchdown) initiative was a NASA effort to encourage the development of robotic lunar landers that could be integrated with United States commercial launch capabilities to deliver payloads to the lunar surface. In 2014 NASA selected three companies for Space Act Agreement partnerships and in 2019 all three were selected for the follow-on Commercial Lunar Payload Services program.

NASA has published that it and other space agencies have plans to launch almost two dozen robotic missions in the next decade (starting 2017) that commercial lunar transportation capabilities may be able to bid for.

== Initiative overview ==
Lunar CATALYST is operated under the Advanced Exploration Systems Division of NASA's Human Exploration and Operations Mission Directorate. The three companies: Astrobotic Technology, Masten Space Systems and Moon Express are being offered SAA but will not be receiving any funds. They will negotiate with the space agency for a partnership to exchange technical expertise and help promote the private space sector.

On November 1, 2016 NASA issued a Request for Information (RFI) about possible small lunar surface payloads that can be delivered to the Moon's surface in the 2017-2020 time-frame using U.S. commercial lunar cargo transportation service providers. Of particular interest were payloads that address NASA's strategic objectives including filling one or more of NASA's lunar exploration Strategic Knowledge Gaps (SKGs).

On May 1, 2017 NASA issued an additional RFI to obtain more Information for Lunar landing services in the decade starting 2018. Responses to be within 30 days. NASA's Science Mission Directorate (SMD) was considering using commercial launches able to fulfill its objectives by sending experiments, instruments, or other payloads to the lunar surface. Detailed information was issued as a business opportunity.

As of November 2017 NASA reports that during the first 3 years the CATALYST partners, working with NASA engineers, have advanced their lander and mission designs through end-to-end mission simulations and subsystems tests, as well as engine hot-fire tests and tethered flight demonstrations. All 3 companies have incorporated NASA's Core Flight System software into their machines.

As of May 2018 NASA has issued a Request for Proposals for Commercial Lunar Payload Services (CLPS) to deliver payloads to the Moon. NASA several contracts for CLPS services will be awarded during the next decade. Missions to the lunar surface expected to begin in 2019.

As well as the small Lunar CATALYST landers, NASA hopes to develop two medium-sized lunar landers under a project called Lunar Surface Transportation Capability. At least one of which has a payload of 1,100 pound (500 kilogram).

== Companies ==
NASA aims to build on its partnerships with the U.S. commercial space industry that are developing new spacecraft and rockets capable of delivering cargo and crew to low Earth orbit. Recognizing United States industry's interest in reaching and exploring the Moon, the Agency has competitively selected three partners to spur commercial cargo transportation capabilities to the surface of the Moon.

The hope is commercial robotic lunar lander capabilities will address emerging demand by private customers who wish to conduct activities on the Moon and could also enable new science and exploration missions of interest to the larger scientific and academic communities.

The Lunar CATALYST initiative signed three no-funds-exchanged Space Act Agreement (SAA) partnerships with U.S. private sector entities. In October 2017 NASA extended the SAA with the companies for 2 additional years. The updated agreements contain new milestones, permitting progress to be monitored. In May 2019, all three of the Lunar CATALYST companies were selected for the Commercial Lunar Payload Services (CLPS) program to deliver science and technology payloads.

=== Astrobotic Technology ===
Astrobotic Technologies of Pittsburgh, Pa. is believed to have bid the 260 kg payload Griffin Lander. Astrobotics has signed a Space Act Agreement with NASA containing 20 Milestones supporting two demonstration missions, the second of which has enhanced navigation and hazard avoidance performance, ending in July 2017. As of July 2015 Astrobotic has developed a preliminary version of its flight software for precision guidance. Testing in simulation validated the Griffin lander's ability to autonomously guide itself to a precise touchdown near the Lacus Mortis pit.As of November 2015 an end-to-end mission simulation has been completed. The CDR (Critical Design Review) is expected in June 2016. In December 2016 Astrobotic slipped their estimated launch date to 2019 and separated from the Google Lunar X Prize. In July 2017 Astrobotic announced that it would be sending a Peregrine Lunar Lander with 35 kg of customer payload to the Moon. The spacecraft will be launched on a United Launch Alliance (ULA) launch vehicle in 2019.

On September 26, 2017 Astrobotic signed a 2-year extension to its SAA with NASA. As of September 2017 the Peregrine Lunar Lander has partially completed Milestone 9: Main engine and Reaction Control System (RCS) hot fire tests. There are 10 milestones to go.

In February 2018 Astrobotic estimated that their Peregrine Lunar Lander would be launched on its first mission to the Moon in 2020.

On November 29, 2018 Astrobotic was awarded a Commercial Lunar Payload Services contract by NASA, which makes it eligible to bid on delivering science and technology payloads to the Moon for NASA.

=== Masten Space Systems ===
Masten Space Systems Inc. of Mojave, Calif. is believed to have bid both the XEUS lander and the smaller XL-1 lander. XEUS comes in two versions. The expendable version can land about 10 tonnes, where as the reusable version can land 5 tonne. As of May 2015 Masten has signed an unfunded Space Act Agreement with NASA containing 22 Milestones to demonstrate the hardware and software for a commercial lunar lander, ending in August 2017. As of September 2017 Milestone 16: Drop test of landing gear components has been completed.

The XL-1 is being designed to soft land a payload of 100 kg (220 lb) on the lunar surface.

The 2-year extension to the NASA/Masten SAA signed September 27, 2017 has a total of 32 milestones. The additional milestones cover XL-1, XL-1T and the XEUS concept.

On November 29, 2018 Masten was awarded a Commercial Lunar Payload Services contract by NASA, which makes it eligible to bid on delivering science and technology payloads to the Moon for NASA. The landing was to be no earlier than 2021. Masten Space Systems declared bankruptcy in 2022 and their assets were purchased by Astrobotic Technology.

=== Moon Express ===
Moon Express Inc., of Moffett Field, Calif. is believed to have bid the MX-1 lander family. In early 2015 Moon Express test flew a tethered prototype lander at the Morpheus Lander test area at NASA's Kennedy Space Center as part of its entry in the Google XPRIZE. The operational spacecraft is designed to be launched as a secondary payload and to fly to the Moon from GEO. As of 22 January 2015 Moon Express has signed a 5-year agreement with Space Florida to perform lunar lander development and flight test operations at Space Launch Complex 36 (SLC-36), Cape Canaveral Air Force Station in Brevard County, Florida.

As of 10 March 2015 Moon Express hopes to soft land on the Moon in 2016. The MX-1 will exit Low Earth Orbit using its hydrogen peroxide engine. Later missions plan to bring back to Earth minerals, Moon rocks and precious metals. The unfunded Space Act Agreement (SAA) with NASA contains 16 milestones ending in March 2017. As of November 2015 the lander's tether test has been completed.

On September 26, 2017 Moon Express signed an extension to its SAA with NASA lasting until September 2019. As of September 2017 Moon Express has completed Milestone 6: MX-1 System design review. There are 17 further milestones.

On November 29, 2018 Moon Express was awarded a Commercial Lunar Payload Services contract by NASA, which makes it eligible to bid on delivering science and technology payloads to the Moon for NASA.

== See also ==
- Commercial Crew Development
- Commercial Lunar Payload Services (CLPS)
- Commercial Orbital Transportation Services (COTS)
- Mighty Eagle
- Project Morpheus
