= BrandYourself =

American online reputation management company

- Type: Privately held company
- Industry: Internet; Public relations
- Founded: 2010
- Founders: Pete Kistler; Patrick Ambron; Evan McGowan-Watson
- Headquarters: New York City, United States
- Key people: Patrick Ambron (CEO); Nathan Evans (COO)
- Products: Online reputation management
- Number of employees: 103
- Website: BrandYourself.com

BrandYourself is a US-based online reputation management company. It provides software and services to help businesses and individuals out-rank search results with new content and websites. It operates on a freemium model, in which certain tools and services are provided without charge, but also offers paid subscriptions and professional services.

The company was founded in 2010 by three students from Syracuse University. In 2015, the company featured on the TV show Shark Tank, where it turned down an investment offer from Robert Herjavec. In 2018, the company's CEO and COO appeared on the BBC show Dragons' Den where they accepted an offer from entrepreneur Peter Jones.

== History ==
BrandYourself was founded by three students from Syracuse University – Pete Kistler, Patrick Ambron, and Evan McGowan-Watson – in 2010. The business was inspired by Kistler's supposed difficulty finding a job as a computer programmer in 2008, due to a drug dealer with the same name. His situation attracted attention in the mainstream media. NPR said the story about the computer programmer Kistler being confused for the drug dealer became "the Internet's approximation of truth" through repetition, but they were unable to find any drug dealers named Pete Kistler.

Shortly after the company's foundation, they raised $300,000 via a seed funding round. In 2012, BrandYourself completed a round of venture capital funding, this time for $1.2 million. Investors in the round included Zelkova Ventures and two angel investors, Barney Pell and Carl Schramm. Pell is the former head search strategist at Microsoft, while Carl Schramm is the former CEO of the Kauffman Foundation.

BrandYourself announced they had closed a Series A round in 2014, with the round totaling $3.3 million.

In 2015, BrandYourself co-founder Ambron appeared on the TV show Shark Tank, in an attempt to raise capital for the company. He stated in interviews that he aimed to raise $2 million for a 13% stake in the company. Robert Herjavec made a proposal to invest in the reputation management firm, agreeing to invest the required $2 million, but for a 25% stake in the business. The offer made by Herjavec was one of the biggest offers made on the show at the time. Ambron ultimately turned down the offer.

Following the appearance on Shark Tank, Ambron was subsequently interviewed by Heavy and gave reasons why the deal was rejected. Ambron stated, "while [Herjavec] was the right Shark, his deal just wasn’t the right deal. Robert offered $2 million for 25% of the company. The problem was we had just raised money that valued the company at double that. Out of fairness to investors, we couldn't accept."

Between the filming of the show, and it's appearing on TV in 2014, the company reported additional growth. At the time of filming, BrandYourself reported $2 million in revenue, but by the time the show aired in 2015, they had "almost tripled" their revenue. In this time period, the company had also grown from 40 employees to over 70.

In 2016, BrandYourself announced an extension of their Series A, raising an additional $2 million of capital. The round was backed by New Atlantic Ventures, FF Angels, and Barney Pell. Ambron stated in TechCrunch that the company was profitable at the time of the extended Series A. He said that the company wanted to use the funds to expand BrandYourself's product lineup.

== Operations ==
BrandYourself started as an online self-service tool for online reputation management with features that helped create websites intended to out-rank those with negative information in certain searches. It operates on a freemium model where certain services are free, but additional features are available for $10 a month.

In May 2012, it set up a service that attempts to track who is making Google searches for a company or person using the service.

Later that year it introduced a tool that evaluates Facebook, LinkedIn and company pages and provides suggestions on how to improve their search engine optimization.

In 2013 the company, initially focused on students and small businesses with smaller budgets, began to compete more directly with its larger competitors by adding professional services. It also added a new user interface for its software and other improvements.

Patrick Ambron stated in an interview that the exposure from Shark Tank led to the professional services side of the business growing its revenue by $1 million within a matter of months after the show aired. As of May 2017, BrandYourself's product had 500,000 users and 30,000 paying subscribers. Syracuse University and Johns Hopkins University use it for their students. In 2017, the company started offering the service to secondary school students and their parents as they prepare to apply to colleges and universities.

In March 2018, BrandYourself introduced artificial intelligence software that scans a user's social media profiles and detects any comments, photos, and posts that may potentially be viewed in a negative light. According to the company, it uses the same algorithms used by potential employers to alert users to problematic content. By April 2018, BrandYourself's total of number of users served had grown to almost 1 million.
