= Modular Common Spacecraft Bus =

General purpose spacecraft platform

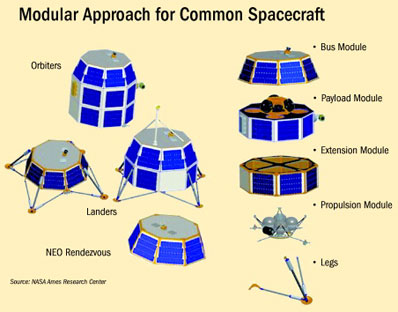
The Modular Common Spacecraft Bus is a multi-use design which could drastically reduce the cost of spacecraft development

The Modular Common Spacecraft Bus (MCSB) is a fast-development, low-cost, general purpose spacecraft platform. Its modular design is intended to reduce the cost, complexity, and lead time on missions by providing a reliable, well-characterized system that can carry a variety of payloads. According to NASA, "the spacecraft is roughly one tenth the price of a conventional uncrewed mission and could be used to land on the Moon, orbit Earth, or rendezvous with near-Earth objects."

== History ==
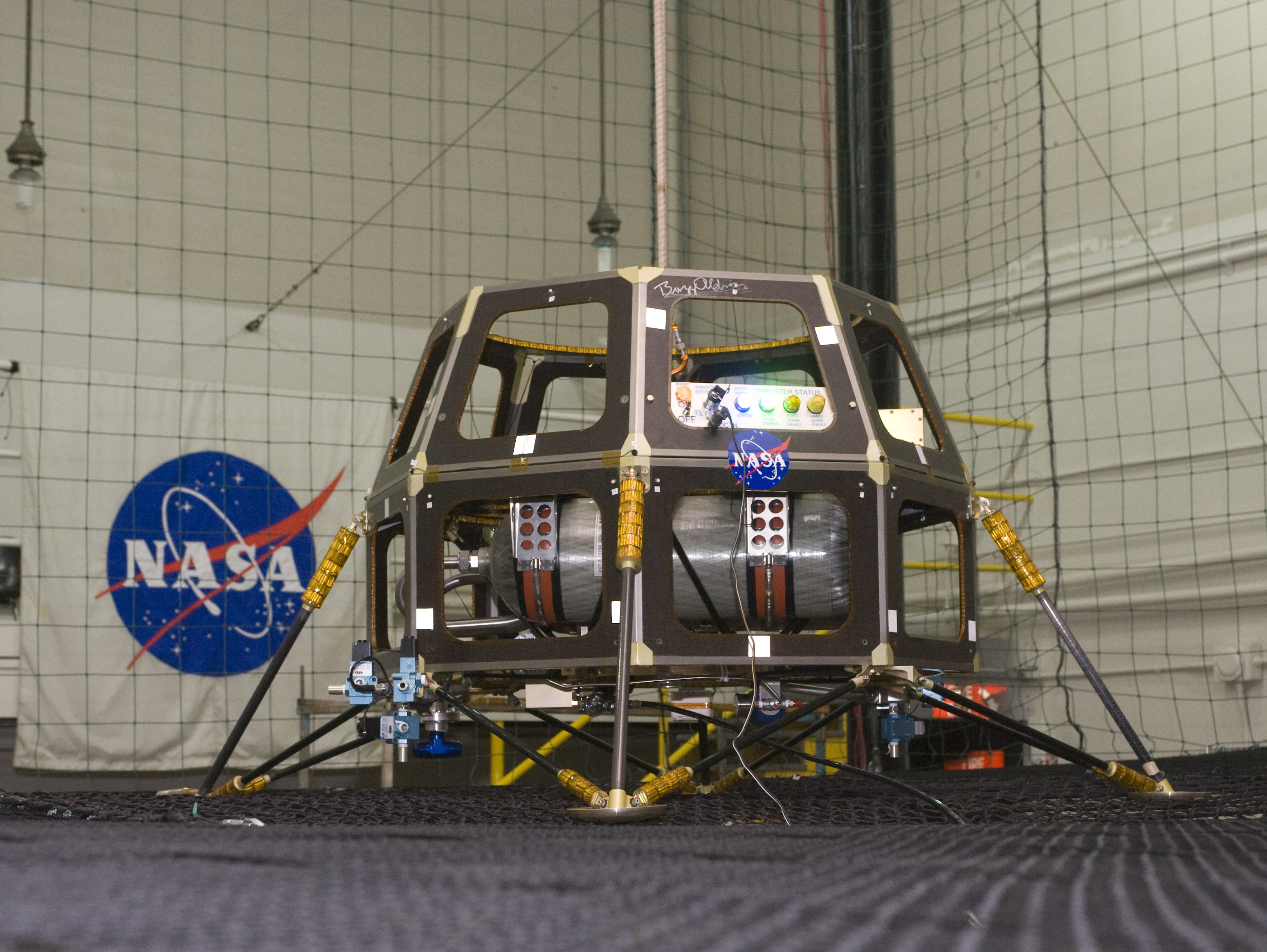
The Modular Common Spacecraft Bus being tested in 2008

The MCSB supervisor, Alan Weston, obtained from NASA Ames Research Center $4 million in internal funding to get the project started. Using that money, the prototype was built in about 15 months during 2007–2008. The fast concept development time is due in part to the preliminary use of repurposed SCUBA air tanks and an engine that uses cold gas, in place of a conventional rocket engine. This allowed the team to perform indoor flight tests as fast as every 40 minutes in their laboratory, rather than waiting weeks or months for a time slot at an appropriate rocket testing facility. After a flight demonstration to top NASA officials, the system was selected as the bus for the planned Lunar Atmosphere and Dust Environment Explorer (LADEE) mission to the Moon, and the project awarded $80 million for further development and construction.

On October 7, 2014, the MCSB design received the Popular Mechanics 2014 Breakthrough Award for innovation in science and technology.

== General description ==
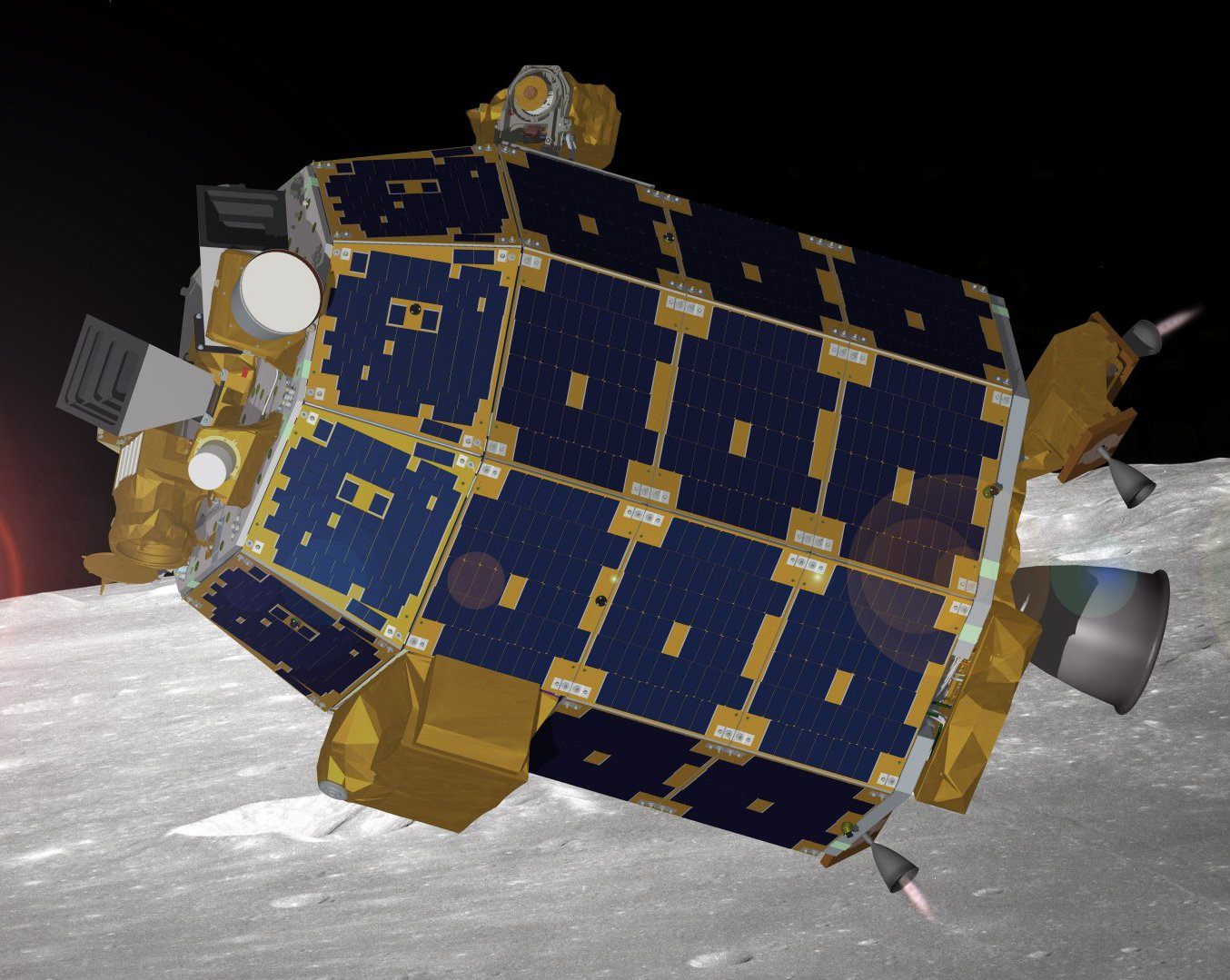
Artist's depiction of the 2013 LADEE in lunar orbit

The modular MCSB spacecraft bus structure has a versatile octagonal shape that can carry up to 50 kg (110 lb) of instruments so long as they can fit inside. The bus is made of a lightweight carbon composite and has the ability to perform on various kinds of missions, including voyages to the Moon and Near-Earth objects, with different modules or applicable systems. This modular concept is an innovative way of transitioning away from custom designs and toward multi-use designs and assembly-line production, which could dramatically reduce the cost of spacecraft development. It can be adapted as an orbiter or a lander.

=== Power ===
MCSB modules can carry solar cells on their eight side faces. On LADEE, electrical power was generated by a photovoltaic system composed of 30 panels of silicon solar cells producing 295 W at one AU. The solar panels were mounted on the satellite's exterior surfaces and the electrical energy was stored in one lithium-ion battery providing up to 24 A·hs at 28 V.

=== Propulsion system ===
LADEE's propulsion system consists of an orbit control system (OCS) and a reaction control system (RCS). The OCS provides velocity control along the +Z axis for large velocity adjustments. The RCS provides three-axis attitude control during burns of the OCS system, and also provides momentum dumps for the reaction wheels which are the primary attitude control system between OCS burns.

For LADEE, the bus was equipped with a 455 N High Performance Apogee Thruster (HiPAT) main engine. The high efficiency 22 N attitude control thrusters are manufactured using high temperature materials and similar to the HiPAT. The main engine provides the majority of the thrust for spacecraft trajectory correction maneuvers. The control system thrusters are used for small maneuvers planned for the science phase of the mission.

== Missions ==
NASA Ames Research Center states that the design concept is best for a lunar orbiter, a lunar lander, spacecraft at Earth-Moon Lagrange points, missions to near Earth objects (NEO) or as a Mars orbiter.

- The system was first flown as the bus for the Lunar Atmosphere and Dust Environment Explorer (LADEE) mission, a successful lunar orbiter launched in September 2013.
- Moon Express, a commercial lunar company that participated in the Google Lunar X PRIZE competition, planned to use the MCSB for its MX-1 lander. The first mission, called the Lunar Scout, was scheduled for July 2020. Moon Express received US$10 million from NASA for sharing results developing their lunar lander using MCSB technology.
- Bus for the proposed Phobos And Deimos & Mars Environment (PADME) orbiter mission to Mars' moons Phobos and Deimos.

== See also ==
- Comparison of satellite buses
