= Rocket City Space Pioneers =

The Rocket City Space Pioneers (RCSP) was one of 29 teams from 17 different countries officially registered and in the competition for the Google Lunar X PRIZE (GLXP) during 2010–2012.

The RCSP was drawn from Alabama businesses, educational institutions, and non-profit organizations. It announced entry into the competition on 7 September 2010, and departed from the competition after the team was acquired by Moon Express in December 2012.

== History ==
In December 2012, the Rocket City Space Pioneers team was acquired by one of the other Google Lunar X-Prize teams, Moon Express, from Dynetics for an undisclosed sum. The new agreement makes Tim Pickens, the former lead of the RCSP team, the Chief Propulsion Engineer for MoonEx.

== Mission ==
The Rocket City Space Pioneers' stated primary mission was to capture the GLXP $20 million Grand Prize, as well as the $4 million Apollo Heritage Bonus Prize.

The RCSP was developing a low-cost lunar lander/rover system for conducting commercial and scientific missions on the Moon. This system was intended to be capable of making a soft landing on the Moon and deploying a robotic rover. It was to be launched from the Earth by a medium-lift launch vehicle as part of a larger payload, then taken to a lunar orbit by a “tug” rocket-propulsion unit, and finally dropped to the Moon's surface.

=== Flight Sequence ===
A Falcon 9 two-stage rocket, built by SpaceX, was notionally planned to be launched from Cape Canaveral Air Force Station to place several metric tons of payload into a Geosynchronous Transfer Orbit (GTO). This RCSP payload was planned to consist of a primary payload, multiple rideshare payloads, and a tug (an ESPA ring with an added propulsion module). Once in Geosynchronous Transfer Orbit, the primary payload was to be deployed, along with three secondary payloads. The tug, containing the remaining three payloads, was to have separated from the Falcon 9 second stage and perform a Trans Lunar Injection burn. As the tug neared the Moon, it was planned to make a final braking burn, inserting it with its payloads in a Low Lunar Orbit (LLO)

Once in LLO, the tug was to have deployed the remaining three payloads, including the RCSP lander. The lander/rover will have its own small retrorocket, and, after being jettisoned from the tug, was projected to conduct a braking maneuver to land softly on the lunar surface. Once on the surface, the lander, would deploy a small rover for the required exploration.

=== Surface Exploration ===
As initially planned by the RCSP team, the rover was to have been capable of driving at least 1 km (0.6 mi) when it reached the lunar surface; this is twice the required GXLP roving distance. The rover was projected to be approximately 30×30×15 cm (12×12×6 in) in size and less than 10 kg (22 lb) in mass. The early design included a plan to leave the rover tethered to the lander, with all external control and communications through this multi-circuit tether. The rover was to have carried two or more high-definition video cameras and possibly other sensors. The lander was to contain the system for communicating with the control center on the Earth, possibly being relayed through the orbiting tug.

The specific landing site and exploration traverse was never announced.

== Team members ==
The RCSP is based in and named after Huntsville, Alabama (widely known as "The Rocket City"). Huntsville has been a leader in rocket development and space exploration since the arrival of Wernher von Braun and his team in 1950.

Members of the RSCP come from businesses, educational institutions, and non-profit organizations having operations in the Huntsville community. The following is a list of those organizations.

- Dynetics (corporate leader) – An employee-owned firm headquartered in Huntsville, Dynetics has provided high-value engineering, scientific, information technology, and specialized manufacturing to government agencies and commercial industries since 1974. Dynetics has a contract with NASA's Johnson Space Center for supplying “Innovative Lunar Demonstrations Data.”
- Teledyne Brown Engineering – A subsidiary of Teledyne Technologies, TBE and its predecessor have operated in Huntsville since 1953. They provided 20 million man-hours supporting every aspect of the Apollo Lunar Program, including the Lunar Rover.
- Andrews Space – Founded in 1999 as a catalyst in the commercialization and development of space, the company formed Spaceflight Services to provide low-cost space access and has an agreement with SpaceX for integration services on the Falcon 9 launch vehicle.
- Draper Laboratory – A not-for-profit research and development organization that has been involved in guidance, navigation, and control for five decades, Draper was a major participant in NASA space programs including Apollo, Space Shuttle, and the International Space Station.
- University of Alabama in Huntsville – With a heritage extending back into the 1950s and an independent university since 1970, UAHuntsville ranks among the top institutes in the nation for NASA research. They have flown more than 20 Space Shuttle and ISS payloads.
- Pratt & Whitney Rocketdyne – A subsidiary of United Technologies Corporation, PWR is a company that designs and produces liquid propellant rocket engines. While PWR headquarters is in Canoga Park, California, they have an operational unit in Huntsville.
- Von Braun Center for Science & Innovation – A not-for-profit research for development operation, the VCSI integrates government, industry and university researchers to provide scientific and engineering solutions in addressing key technological problems.
- Huntsville Center for Technology – A unit of the Huntsville City School system, their “Engineering Meets Education” program will allow high school students to directly participate with the RCSP team in a variety of activities.

The RCSP is led by Tim Pickens, chief propulsion engineer and commercial space advisor at Dynetics. An inventor, innovator, and educator, Pickens was previously the founder and CEO of Orion Propulsion and, earlier, was the lead propulsion engineer on SpaceShipOne, the winner of the $10 million Ansari X Prize.
