= Moon Express =

American privately held space exploration company

- Type: Private
- Industry: Aerospace
- Founded: 2010
- Headquarters: Cape Canaveral, FL 32920
- Key people: Robert D. Richards, Naveen Jain, Barney Pell
- Website: moonexpress.com

Moon Express (MoonEx; vehicle model prefix: MX) is an American privately held company formed in 2010 by a group of Silicon Valley and space entrepreneurs. It had the goal of winning the $30 million Google Lunar X Prize, and of ultimately mining the Moon for natural resources of economic value. The company was not able to make a launch attempt to reach the Moon by March 31, 2018, the deadline for the prize.

Since late 2018, and as of February 2020, Moon Express focused on supporting NASA under its Commercial Lunar Payload Services (CLPS) contract.

== History ==
In August 2010, Robert D. Richards, Naveen Jain, and Barney Pell co-founded Moon Express, a Mountain View, California-based company that plans to offer commercial lunar robotic transportation and data services with a long-term goal of mining the Moon for resources, including elements that are rare on Earth, including niobium, yttrium and dysprosium.

Beginning in 2010, Moon Express based itself at the NASA Ames Research Center. Moon Express and NASA signed a contract in October 2010 for data purchase that could be worth up to US$10,000,000.

On June 30, 2011, the company held its first successful test flight of a prototype lunar lander system called the Lander Test Vehicle (LTV) that was developed in partnership with NASA. On September 11, 2011, Moon Express set up a robotics lab for a lunar probe named the "Moon Express Robotics Lab for INnovation" (MERLIN) and hired several engineering students who had successfully competed at the FIRST Robotics Competition.

In mid-2012, Moon Express started work with the International Lunar Observatory Association (ILOA) to put a shoebox-sized astronomical telescope called International Lunar Observatory on the Moon.

By 2012, MoonEx had 20 employees, and in December 2012, MoonEx acquired one of the other Google Lunar X-Prize teams, Rocket City Space Pioneers, from Dynetics for an undisclosed sum. The agreement made Tim Pickens, the former lead of the RCSP team, the Chief Propulsion Engineer for MoonEx. In September 2013, MoonEx added Paul Spudis as Chief Scientist and Jack Burns as Science Advisory Board Chair.

In October and November 2013, Moon Express conducted several free flight tests of its flight software utilizing the NASA Mighty Eagle lander test vehicle, under a Reimbursable Space Act Agreement with the NASA Marshall Space Flight Center. One month later, in December 2013, MoonEx unveiled the MX-1 lunar lander, a toroidal robotic lander that uses high-test hydrogen peroxide as its rocket propellant to support vertical landing on the lunar surface. On April 30, 2014 NASA announced that Moon Express was one of the three companies selected for the Lunar CATALYST initiative.

By December 2014, Moon Express successfully conducted flight tests of its "MTV-1X" lander test vehicle at the Kennedy Space Center Shuttle Landing Facility, becoming the first private company (and GLXP team) to demonstrate a commercial lunar lander test.

In 2015, the company announced that it would lease part of Florida's Cape Canaveral Launch Complex 36 for 5 years, and relocate operations there. In July 2016, Moon Express stated it would leave LC 36 and be taking over Cape Canaveral Launch Complexes 17 and 18.

On July 20, 2016, the Federal Aviation Administration approved Moon Express plans for a mission to deliver commercial payloads to the Moon, making Moon Express the first private company to receive government approval for a commercial space mission beyond traditional Earth orbit under the requirements of the Outer Space Treaty.

On October 31, 2017, NASA extended the no-funds Space Act Agreement with Moon Express, for the Lunar CATALYST initiative, for 2 more years.

On July 12, 2018, both historic launch towers at Space Launch Complex 17 were demolished via controlled demolition to make way for Moon Express facilities to test its lunar lander. That month, Moon Express was unable to make payroll and laid off nine employees; the employees did not receive back-pay until October 2018.

In October 2018, the company signed several collaboration agreements with the Canadian Space Agency (CSA) and a number of Canadian aerospace companies.

On November 29, 2018, Moon Express joined the Commercial Lunar Payload Services program of NASA, becoming eligible to bid on delivering science and technology payloads to the Moon for NASA.

== Google Lunar XPRIZE ==
The company was a competitor in the Google Lunar X Prize. The prize was an award of $30 million to the first team to land a robotic spacecraft on the Moon and deliver data, images and video from the landing site and from 500 meters away from its landing site.

Moon Express signed a contract with Rocket Lab on 30 September 2015 for three Electron launches of Moon Express robotic spacecraft in pursuit of the X Prize, starting in 2017.

The first mission, called the Lunar Scout, was planned for 2017 (later delayed to July 2020) and would use the MX-1E lander. This was a technology demonstration flight that included three payloads:

- International Lunar Observatory (ILO-1) is a small optical telescope that will operate from the lunar south pole. The selected landing location is the 5 km (3.1 mi)-high Malapert mountain.
- MoonLIGHT is a laser retroreflector experiment built by Italy's INFN and the University of Maryland to perform research on gravity and on general relativity.
- Celestis memorial container with some human remains.

The second mission was the Lunar Outpost MX-3, a robotic lander to the lunar south pole that would scout for water ice and other lunar resources. The third mission, called Harvest Moon, would be a sample-return mission.

By October 2015, there were 16 teams competing for the prize. On January 23, 2018, X Prize founder and chairman Peter Diamandis stated "After close consultation with our five finalist Google Lunar X Prize teams over the past several months, we have concluded that no team will make a launch attempt to reach the moon by the March 31, 2018, deadline."

Following the end of the Google Lunar X Prize, Moon Express shelved the planned lunar lander missions and turned its efforts toward competing in the Commercial Lunar Payload Services program instead.

== Spacecraft ==
MX-1
- Manufacturer: Moon Express
- Designer: Moon Express
- Country of origin: US
- Operator: Moon Express
- Applications: Commercial lunar transport

Specifications
- Spacecraft type: Robotic lunar lander
- Bus: MCSB
- Launch mass: 250 kg (550 lb)
- Payload capacity: 30 kg (66 lb)
- Power: 200 W

Capacity

Payload to {{{to}}}

Production
- Status: In development
- Maiden launch

Related spacecraft
- Derivatives: MX-2, MX-5, MX-9

PECO
- Powered by: 1
- Propellant: RP-1 / hydrogen peroxide

The company's robotic spacecraft are based on NASA's Modular Common Spacecraft Bus (MCSB), which are modular and scalable platforms that can be configured as landers or orbiters.

All MoonEx robotic spacecraft use low-toxicity fuels, advanced carbon composites and silicates and a Moon Express PECO rocket engine. The PECO main engine uses RP-1 as a fuel and hydrogen peroxide as an oxidiser. The landing thrusters use hydrogen peroxide as a monopropellant. PECO stands for 'propulsion that is eco-friendly'. The company has the "MX lander family":

- MX-1 – a single-engine spacecraft with a mass of 250 kg (fuelled); 30 kg payload capacity.
- MX-2 – a twin-engine spacecraft with a 30 kg payload capacity.
- MX-5 – a 5-engine platform configuration that can include MX-1 or MX-2 staged system. The MX-5 has a 150 kg payload capacity.
- MX-9 – a 9-engine platform configuration, designed for sample return. The MX-9 has a payload capacity of about 500 kg.

== See also ==
- Exogeology
- Geology of the Moon
- Lunar resources
- Lunar water
- NewSpace
