= Phobos Surveyor =

Proposed Phobos orbiter

Phobos Surveyor is a mission concept under preliminary study by Marco Pavone of Stanford University, the NASA Jet Propulsion Laboratory (JPL), and the Massachusetts Institute of Technology as a part of NASA's Innovative Advanced Concepts program.

The concept consists of an orbiter around Mars's moon Phobos, designed to take measurements of the surface such as chemical composition and deploy small, sea-urchin-shaped rovers to the surface. These rovers would perform more detailed analysis of the moon's microscopic geological features and other properties, beaming their information back to the orbiter, which in turn would send the information to Earth.

The mission could be a Discovery-class mission, and could be beneficial to the future crewed space program by investigating the low-gravity Phobos's suitability for an occupied base before the construction of one on Mars itself and where on the moon landing sites for crewed missions should be. Although designed with "Phobos in mind" according to Pavone, this technology could be applied to missions to other small Solar System bodies.

== Testing and mission architecture ==
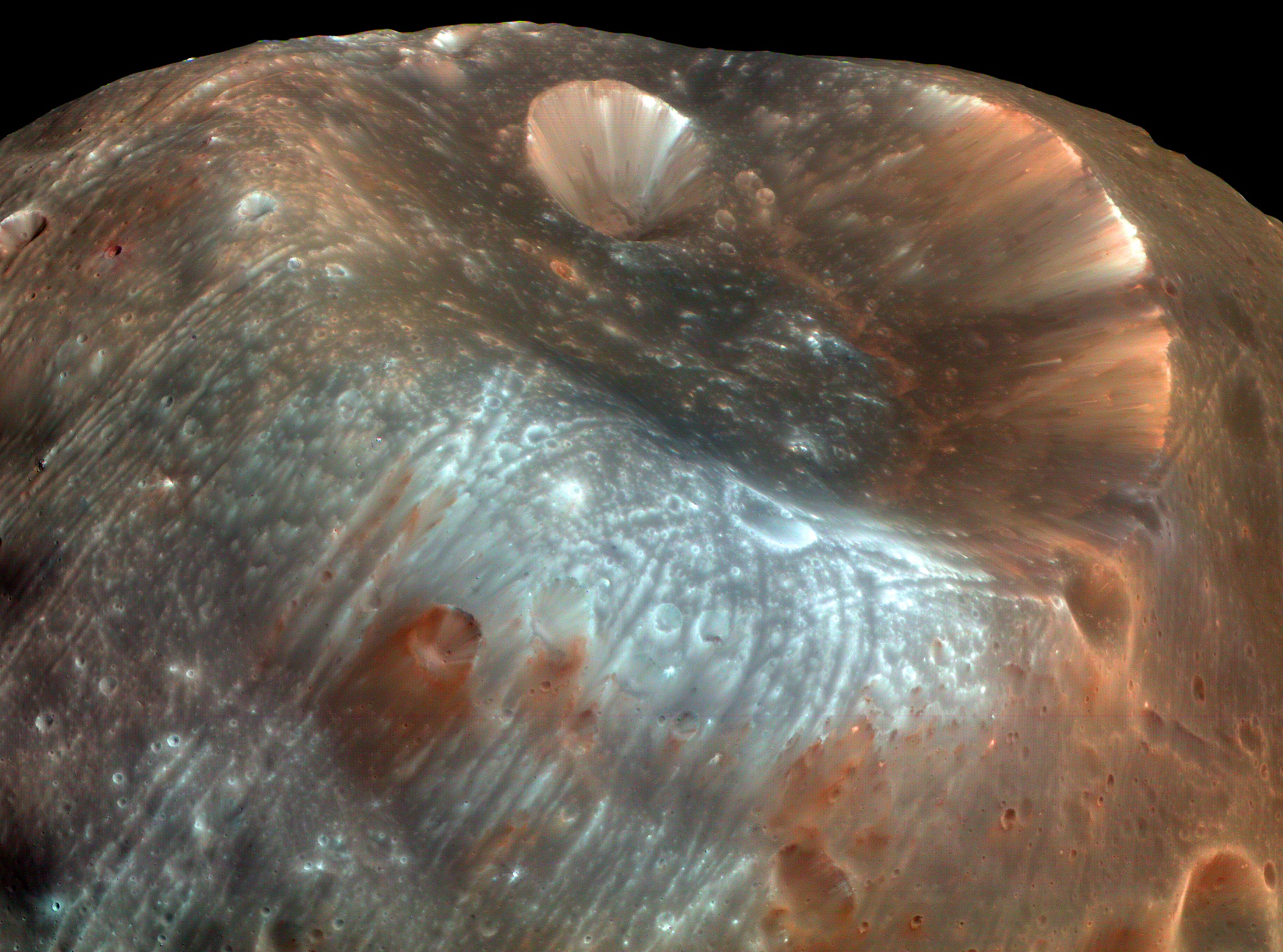
The crater Stickney, a preferred target for Phobos Surveyor.

Pavone and his group have already constructed and tested two generations of rovers, and hopes to begin low-gravity testing of his rovers by the summer of 2013. These tests will simulate the low-gravity environment of Phobos first by means of a crane and by 2015, Pavone hopes, using an aircraft designed to reduce the force of gravity for its occupants. In 2015, he did try out the rovers. The testing arena will be designed to mimic the surface of Phobos as closely as possible, containing rocks and using flour to take the place of asteroid dust.

In the mission concept, the rovers would be released near Phobos's large crater Stickney, where the orbiter would hover in a stable orbit around Phobos, and where the rovers themselves would gain access to the innermost rock layers of Phobos for analysis in situ and create a target for a future sample-return mission. This would be important scientifically, as it would allow a determination of whether Phobos is an asteroid captured by Mars's gravity, or a fragment of Mars that was lifted into orbit by an asteroid or comet impact and would increase knowledge on the nature of Mars itself. A mission to Phobos would also give the scientific community greater insights into the formation and evolution of the Solar System into its present state.

The low gravity of Phobos, as well as the existence of caves created by the impact that also created Stickney, make Phobos a prime target for the construction of a space colony, due to the ease of launching rockets from its surface (resulting from its low gravity) and the radiation protection provided by the caves. Further assessment of the moon as a location for colonization and where on the moon human colonies should be constructed would be possible with the relatively inexpensive rovers before taking on the expense of crewed missions.

== Rover design ==
Measuring roughly 2 feet (0.6 m) across, the rovers for Phobos Surveyor are shaped like sea urchins in order to adapt to the low-gravity environments in which they are designed to function, for which they have been often called "hedgehogs". Propulsion of the hedgehogs, rather than with wheels as in traditional Mars rovers, involves three spinning disks in an orthogonal configuration, which are accelerated or decelerated to change the hedgehogs' speed and whose inertia allows the hedgehogs to move around Phobos. Consequently, the hedgehogs will move not by rotating themselves on the surface, but rather in a series of controlled hops or short flights across the surface of the body they are exploring, powered by solar panels on each rover's surface.

In addition to their ability to work well in conditions of low gravity, the hedgehog design, as well as other designs which move by hopping around a body's surface, have several advantages over traditional rovers. Rather than being stopped by geological features such as canyons and crevasses, these designs, collectively known as hoppers, can simply hop over such impediments. In addition, hoppers cannot have stuck wheels, a problem which ended the mission of NASA's Spirit Mars rover.

Although there will be some degree of control of the hedgehogs by humans on Earth, they are largely robotic and will take most decisions without human intervention, determining their location and future movements by means of communication with each other. Pavone states that the new system represents "the next level of autonomy in space."

== See also ==
- Fobos Grunt – 2011 Russian attempted sample-return mission to the Martian moon Phobos
- Phobos And Deimos & Mars Environment – NASA Mars orbiter mission concept
- Phobos program – 1988 Soviet missions to Mars
- List of missions to Mars
