= Mighty Eagle =

Prototype robotic lander developed by NASA

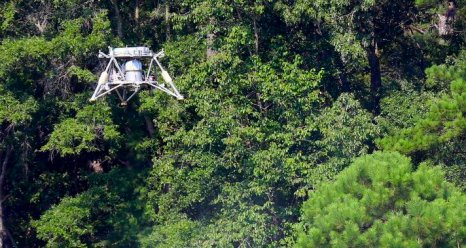
- Mighty Eagle lander
- Operator: NASA

Spacecraft properties
- Spacecraft type: Lander testbed
- Manufacturer: NASA
- Dry mass: 207kg
- Dimensions: 4ft height, 8ft diameter

Start of mission
- Entered service: June 13, 2011

End of mission
- Deactivated: December 2013

Payload
- 3D camera

The Mighty Eagle (also known as the Ethan Chapman) was a prototype robotic lander developed by NASA at the Marshall Space Flight Center in Huntsville, Alabama.

The vehicle is an autonomous flying testbed that is used for testing hardware, sensors and algorithms. These sensors and algorithms include such things as onboard cameras that, with specialized guidance, navigation and control software, could aid in the capture of orbiting space debris, in-space docking with a fuel depot, docking of a robotic lander with an orbiting command module and the rendezvous of multiple unmanned stages for deep space human exploration of the Solar System.

== History ==
Initial software and hardware development were done on a precursor vehicle called the Cold Gas Test Article which used compressed air as a propellant and had about 10 seconds of flight time. The knowledge gained from this development and testing was used in the design of the Mighty Eagle.

The Mighty Eagle prototype lander was developed by the Marshall Center and Johns Hopkins University Applied Physics Laboratory. Key partners in this project include the Von Braun Center for Science and Innovation, the Science Applications International Corporation, Dynetics Corporation and Teledyne Brown Engineering.

The design of the vehicle began in late 2009 and integration was completed in January 2011. The vehicle was transported to an indoor test facility and bolted to the ground for initial testing, followed by free flight testing. Outdoor testing at another facility ran from August to November 2011. In 2012, a test area at MSFC was developed and the Mighty Eagle tested "Autonomous Rendezvous and Capture" technology. In 2013, enhancements were made including legs that are lighter by about 6.8 kg (15 lbs), a 3D stereo camera that allows the detection and avoidance of 3D (three dimensional) objects and an onboard image processor in preparation for "hazard avoidance" testing.

In July 2013 a hazard field (test area for the lander) consisting of 200 tons of lunar simulant began construction at the Marshall Space Flight Center.

In August 2013 the hazard field was completed. The 3D camera was installed in an enclosure on the vehicle permitting the camera to be pointed at three different angles.

After many tests (described below) the Mighty Eagle lander was put into "organization and storage" in December 2013. Information from the NASA Robotic Lunar Lander Development Project (aka Mighty Eagle) was merged into the Lunar CATALYST initiative.

The lander is named after the Mighty Eagle character, who originated from the Angry Birds video game.

== Specifications ==
Three-legged "green" lander:

- Fuel - 90 percent pure hydrogen peroxide
- Main thrust is provided by an EGC (Earth Gravity Cancelling) thruster giving 500 pounds-force (2,200 N) to 700 pounds-force (3,100 N) of thrust
- High purity nitrogen stored at ~3000 psi is regulated down to ~750 psi and is used to push the peroxide out of the thrusters. The vehicle can carry 7 kilograms (15 lb) of pressurant.
- Twelve Attitude Control System (ACS) thrusters each giving 10 pounds-force (44 N) of thrust provide attitude control
- 3D camera which was given its own battery as part of the 200th modification to the vehicle.
- Onboard computer responsible for execution of pre-programmed flight profiles
- Dimensions - 4 feet (1.2 m) tall and 8 feet (2.4 m) in diameter
- Mass - when fuelled is ~700 pounds (320 kg)
- Performs vertical take off and vertical landings (VTVL)

For additional information see the Robotic Lunar Lander information pages.

=== Engines ===
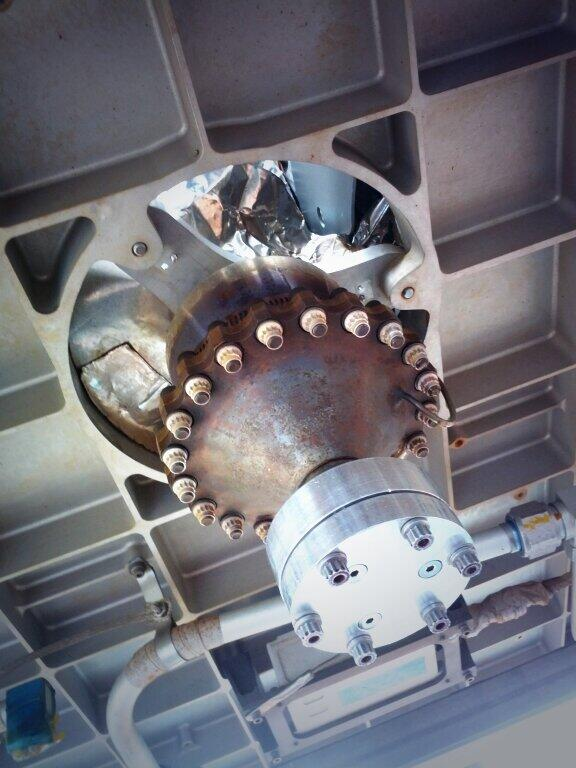
Main thruster of the NASA Mighty Eagle

The NASA Mighty Eagle produces thrust by the violent decomposition of hydrogen peroxide (H_{2}O_{2}) using silver as a catalyst.

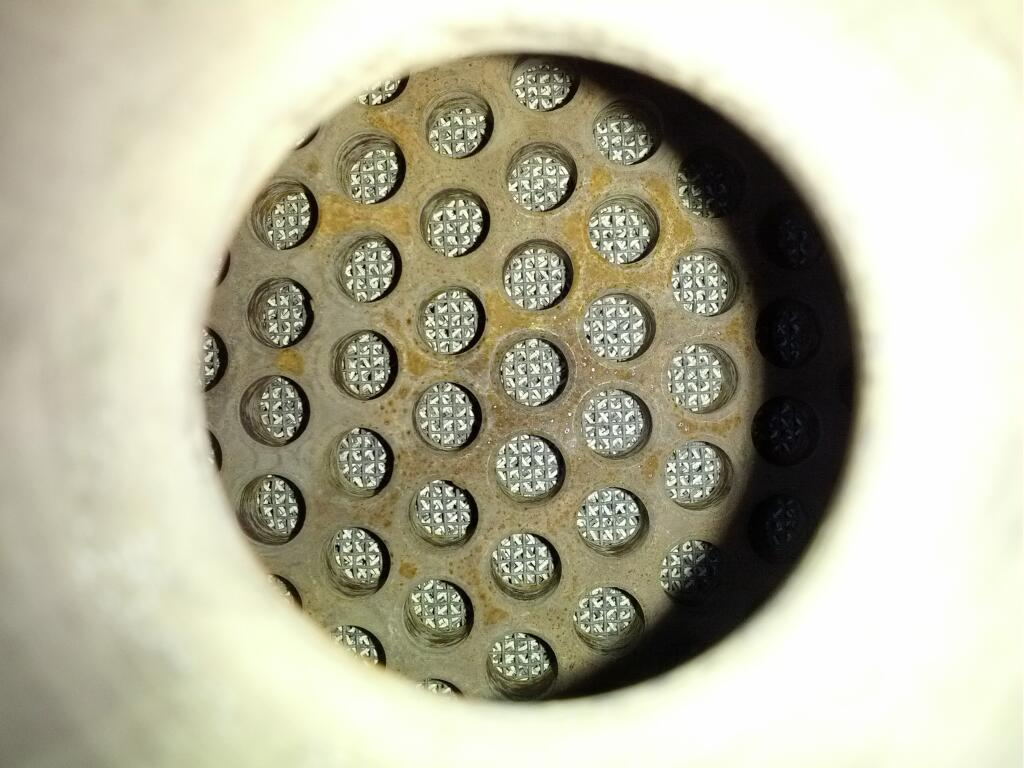
Peroxide decomposition catalyst plate in main thruster

== Testing ==
Prior to the flight tests, each subsystem was testing individually including the propulsion system.

=== Flight tests in 2011 ===
- January 2011 - NASA engineers successfully integrated and completed system testing on a new robotic lander at Teledyne Brown Engineering's facility in Huntsville. Part of the testing involved placing the robotic lander prototype on modified skateboards and a customized track system. This low-cost solution controlled movement during the final testing of the prototype's sensors, onboard computer and thrusters.
- June 13, 2011 - indoor free (untethered) flight to 7 feet for 27 seconds.
- June 16, 2011 - Second free flight including a hover at 6 feet with controlled descent. The inertial measurement unit and radar altimeter were used to control the flight.
- August 23, 2011 - Performed a translated manoeuvre, (i.e. moved itself sideways) to execute a controlled, safe landing 13 feet from the launch pad.
- October–November 2011 - the Robotic Lander Development Project from NASA's Marshall Space Flight Center in Huntsville performed a series of complex tests on the prototype lander. At the Redstone Test Center's propulsion test facility on the U.S. Army Redstone Arsenal in Huntsville, Alabama the machine flew to three feet, then 30 feet, and finally a record 100-foot flight test. The flight lasted 30 seconds.

=== Summer 2012 tests ===
"These lander tests provide the data necessary to expand our capabilities to go to other destinations".

- August 8, 2012 - Mighty Eagle flew to a height of 100 feet (30 m) and landed safely.
- August 28, 2012 - flew to a height of 100 feet (30 m). During the 35 second flight the lander automatically identified its destination 10 m away, flew there and landed safely.
- September 5, 2012 - flew to a height of 100 feet (30 m), used an onboard camera to identify an on-the-ground target and then autonomously landed itself at the chosen spot. Deliberately only carrying 103 kilograms (227 lb) of fuel this time.
- October 19, 2012 - WGTA tethered test of software changes.
- October 25, 2012 - Flew to a height of 50 metres (160 ft), above the tree tops.

=== 2013 tests ===
A hazard field test area that simulates the lunar surface, including boulders, is being prepared. Amongst the test software and hardware modifications was procurement of a quadcopter whose WIFI camera can film midflight.

- April 10, 2013 - Regression test flight to three feet with lighter legs. The vehicle's three legs were tethered to the ground.
- April 19, 2013 - Free flight test with hundreds of student spectators. The flight was filmed with a quadcopter.
- August 30, 2013 - Tethered test flight with the 3D camera in its new point-able enclosure.
- September 16, 2013 - HAZ02 A free flight across the Hazard Field. 110.02 kg of propellant pressurised to 760 psi was loaded. The flight was successful, although dust was kicked up the vehicle was able to take a reconnaissance photograph of the Hazard Field. Modifications were made to the vehicle because test data from the practice flight on September 4, 2013, showed that there was insufficient power for the camera and intermittently the EGC throttle motor does not fully open. The flight can be seen in this video taken from a quadcopter.
- September 20, 2013 HAZ03 - A free flight across the Hazard Field. The field had been watered to reduce dust. Guidance software from Moon Express was also carried to test to see if its outputs matched those of the NASA Guidance Software.
- September 26, 2013 Repeat of HAZ02. Mighty Eagle flew at a height of 20m and translating 45m. Moving pictures of the flight can be seen in this documentary.
- October 24, 2013 Test sequence HAZ05 was flown. This simulated a real landing by NASA Mighty Eagle ascending to 30m followed by a descending to 20m while translating and taking stereo images across the field. Only 100 kg of propellant were loaded. The flight can be seen in this video, including the steam/fog cloud produced by the cold.
- November 14, 2013 Tethered Test flight with modifications. Only 42.06 kg of propellant loaded. The normal software was replaced by guidance software form Moon Express. The Nanolaunch team supplied a secondary payload including several low-cost Inertial measurement units and Global Positioning System sensors for in flight characterization and algorithm testing.
- November 25, 2013 Test MEG02 The vehicle flew to a height of three meters at a vertical velocity of 0.5 m/s, followed by a 12-second hover and finished with a descent at -1 m/s under the control of the Moon Express software.

Further details about the tests and hardware can be found in the "Mighty Eagle: The Development and Flight Testing of an Autonomous Robotic Lander Test Bed" article in Johns Hopkins APL Technical Digest.

== See also ==
- VTVL (Vertical Take off Vertical Landing)
- Project Morpheus
- Lunar CATALYST
