= Phobos And Deimos & Mars Environment =

NASA Mars orbiter mission concept

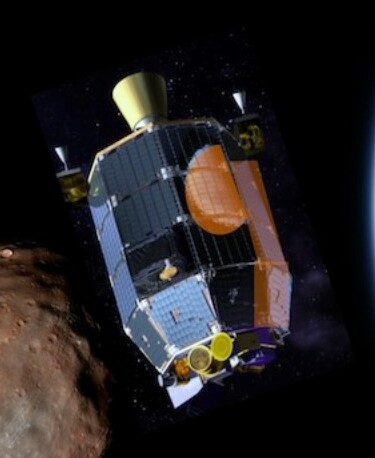
- Mission type: Reconnaissance of Mars' moons
- Operator: NASA

Spacecraft properties
- Bus: Modular Common Spacecraft Bus (MCSB)
- Manufacturer: NASA Ames Research Center

Start of mission
- Rocket: Atlas V, Delta IV or Falcon 9
- Launch site: Kennedy Space Center

Mars' moons: Phobos and Deimos orbiter

Phobos And Deimos & Mars Environment (PADME) is a low-cost NASA Mars orbiter mission concept that would address longstanding unknowns about Mars' two moons Phobos and Deimos and their environment.

The PADME mission competed for Discovery Program funding, but lost to the Psyche and Lucy missions. The Principal Investigator is Anthony Colaprete. Other principals include Pascal Lee (Deputy Principal Investigator) and Butler Hine (Project Manager).

== Objectives ==
The origin of Mars' moons, which were discovered by astronomer Asaph Hall, remains unknown. PADME would advance the scientific understanding of the origin of Phobos and Deimos by studying:

- Composition of surface and near-surface materials
- Internal structure
- Dynamics (transport) of surface materials on, and between, Deimos and Phobos.

In addition, PADME would assess potential resources (water, organics, regolith) and potential hazards (dust) that Phobos and Deimos might present for future human exploration in Mars orbit.

== Mission ==
Once in Mars orbit, PADME would carry out 16 flybys of Phobos followed by 9 flybys of Deimos. Flybys would take place at two-week intervals. Flyby altitudes at closest approach to Phobos and Deimos would be ~2 km. Following completion of its primary mission, PADME could remain in high Mars orbit for long-term monitoring of the martian system and search for potential additional moonlets around Mars. Alternatively, PADME could be made to escape Mars and eventually fly by a Near-Earth Object (NEO).

== Spacecraft ==
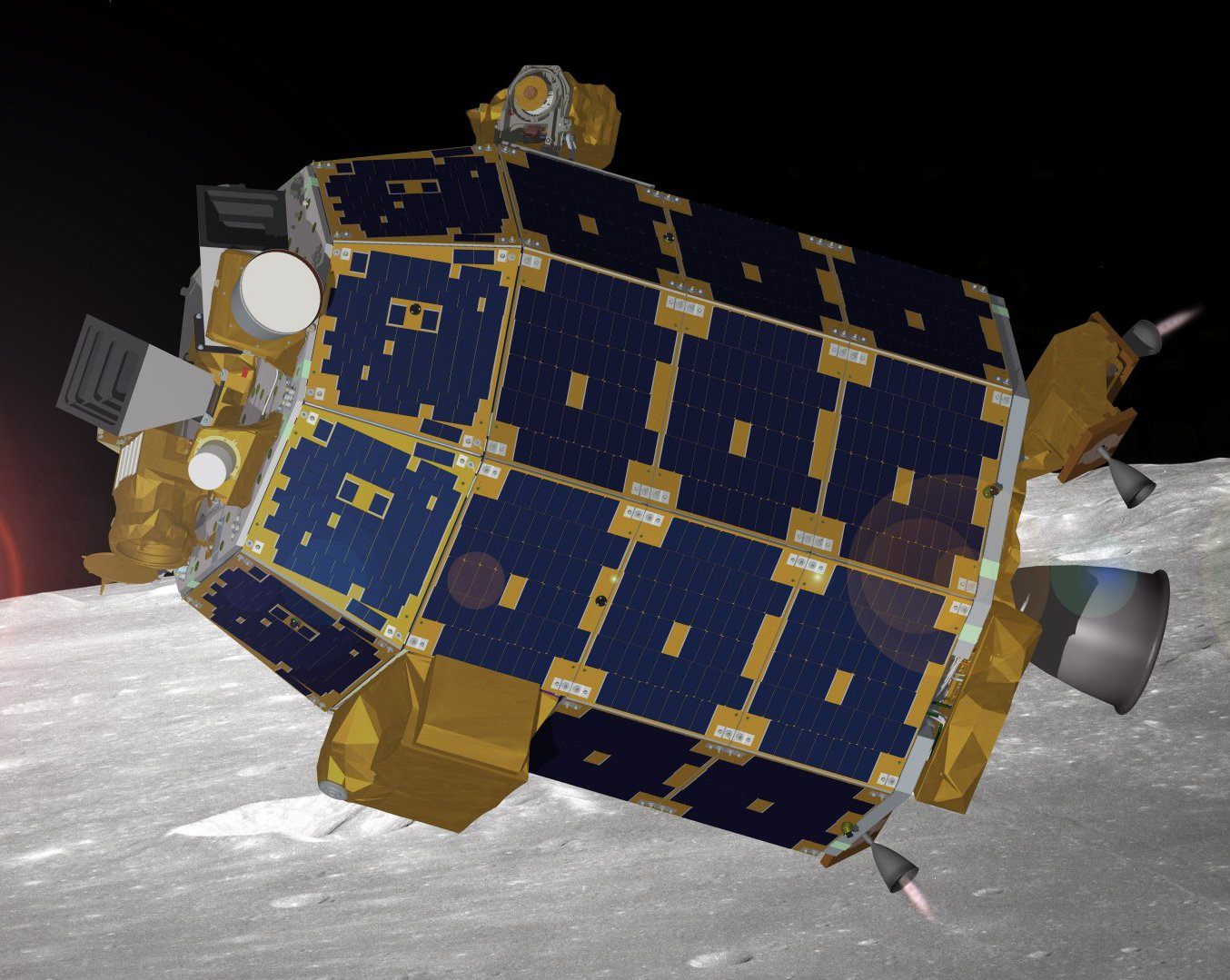
The modular MCSB bus and some payload elements were successfully flown on the 2013 LADEE mission to the Moon

NASA Ames Research Center would design, develop, build, and test the PADME spacecraft, and manage mission operations. The proposal is to employ the proven Modular Common Spacecraft Bus (MCSB), previously used by the LADEE Moon orbiter. Major partners include the SETI Institute, Jet Propulsion Laboratory, NASA Goddard Space Flight Center, and University of Colorado's Laboratory for Atmospheric and Space Physics.

== Scientific payload ==
The PADME mission has four science instruments plus a radio science experiment which uses the spacecraft's radio communications system.

- Neutron Spectrometer (NS) would count epithermal and thermal neutrons at Phobos and Deimos during close flybys. The cumulative measurements at each moon would provide quantitative measurements of the bulk composition and hydrogen abundance (and by implication, water abundance) in the topmost l meter of Phobos and Deimos' regolith. The NS instrument would be provided by NASA Ames Research Center.
- Neutral Mass Spectrometer – Enhanced (NMS-E) would measure the composition of Phobos and Deimos's tenuous solar wind-induced exospheres during close flybys, to identify the surface composition of these moons in non-volatile elements. NMS-E is an upgraded version of LADEE's Neutral Mass Spectrometer (NMS) and MAVEN's Neutral Gas and Ion Mass Spectrometer (NGIMS) instruments, with enhanced sensitivity. The NMS-E instrument would be provided by NASA Goddard Space Flight Center.
- Radio Science (RS) experiment would measure the gravity field of Phobos and Deimos by tracking Doppler effect shifts in the signals from the spacecraft's radio communications system during close flybys of the moons. RS would reveal the internal structure of Phobos and Deimos. The RS experiment would be led by the Jet Propulsion Laboratory.
- Optical Imaging System (OIS) is an optically mounted 3-camera system that would produce global, regional, and local color image maps of Phobos and Deimos. The OIS would also measure the libration amplitude of Phobos, to better understand its internal structure. The OIS would achieve a spatial resolution of ~8 cm/pxl in color, and 2.6 cm/pxl in monochromatic mode. The OIS instrument would be provided by the Jet Propulsion Laboratory.
- Mars Dust Experiment (MDEX) is an impact-ionization dust detector that would intercept and analyze dust particles encountered around Mars, in particular in close proximity to Phobos and Deimos. MDEX is identical to LADEE's successful Lunar Dust Experiment (LDEX). The MDEX instrument would be provided by the University of Colorado's Laboratory for Atmospheric and Space Physics.

The orbiter could also carry an optional laser communications experiment.

- Phobos AND DeimOs Retroreflector Array (PANDORA) is a compact passive laser retroreflector device on the PADME spacecraft that would be used as a laser ranging time-of-flight target for a laser communication system on Mars (possibly on board NASA's Mars 2020 rover) to conduct technology demonstrations of laser communication through the martian atmosphere. PANDORA would be provided by the Italian Space Agency and the Istituto Nazionale di Fisica Nucleare.

== Proposed launch ==
PADME could launch on a Medium-lift class launch vehicle. The spacecraft would fit within all Atlas V, Delta IV, and Falcon 9 launch vehicle fairings. If selected, PADME would have been launched in August 2020 and reached Mars seven months later, by March 2021.

== International participation ==
PADME includes the participation of scientists from Belgium, France, Italy, and Japan.

== See also ==
- Discovery Program
- List of missions to Mars
- Phobos Surveyor (US mission to Phobos design)
- Fobos Grunt (Russian mission to Phobos)
- Phobos program (Soviet mission to Phobos)
