= Masten Space Systems =

American aerospace company

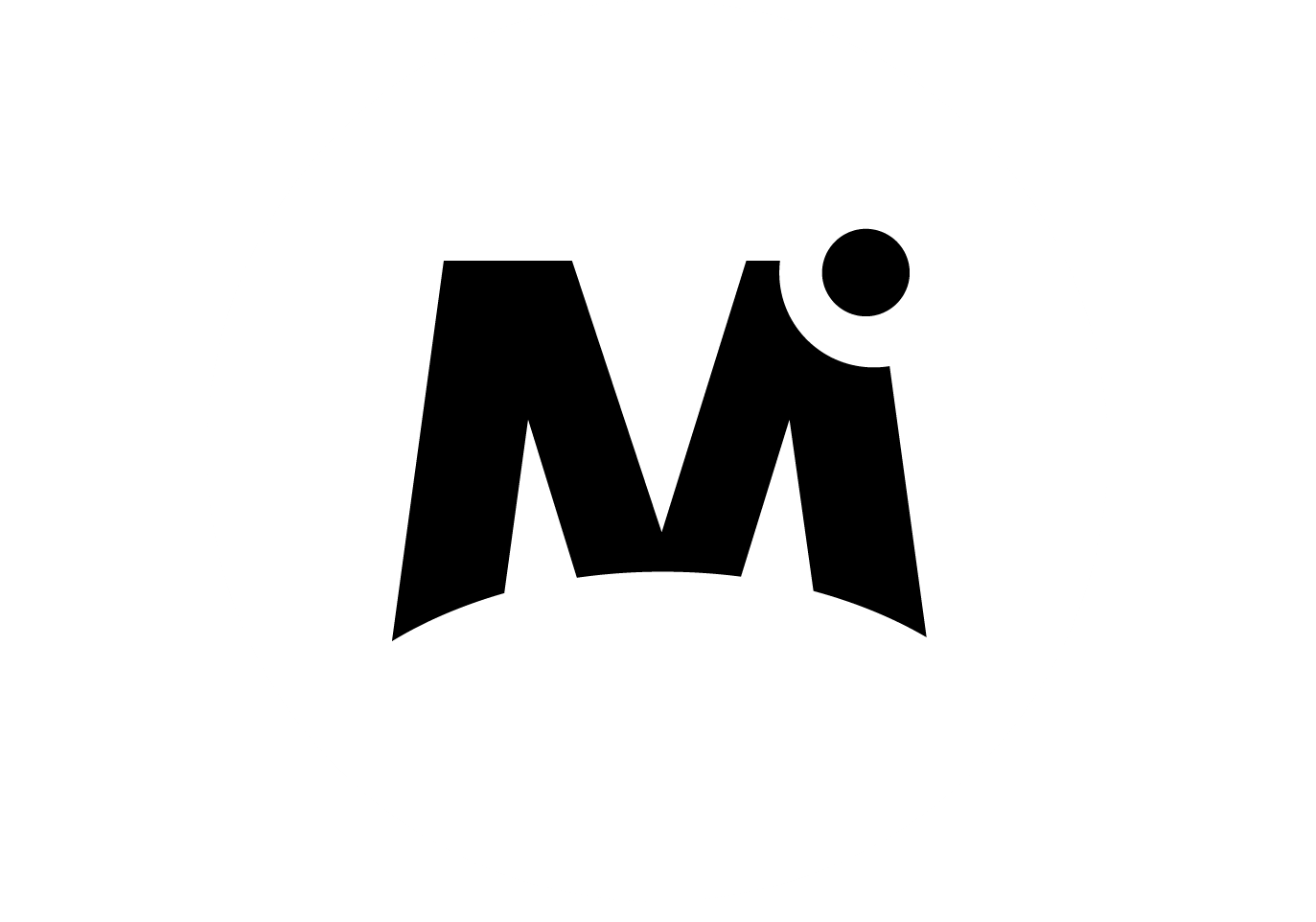
- Type: Private
- Industry: Aerospace and defense
- Founded: 2004
- Defunct: 2022
- Fate: Acquired by Astrobotic
- Headquarters: Mojave, California; United States
- Key people: Sean Mahoney, CEO; David Masten, CTO and Chairman; Reuben Garcia, Executive Manager of Landing Systems; Matthew Kuhns, Chief Engineer
- Products: Suborbital spacecraft Space systems Throttleable rocket engines Rocket propulsion hardware Reusable launch vehicles
- Services: Rocket propulsion design and analysis Space hardware tests Concept demonstration Vertical landing software
- Number of employees: 84 (2020)
- Website: masten.aero
- Footnotes; The company's slogan is "We Fly"

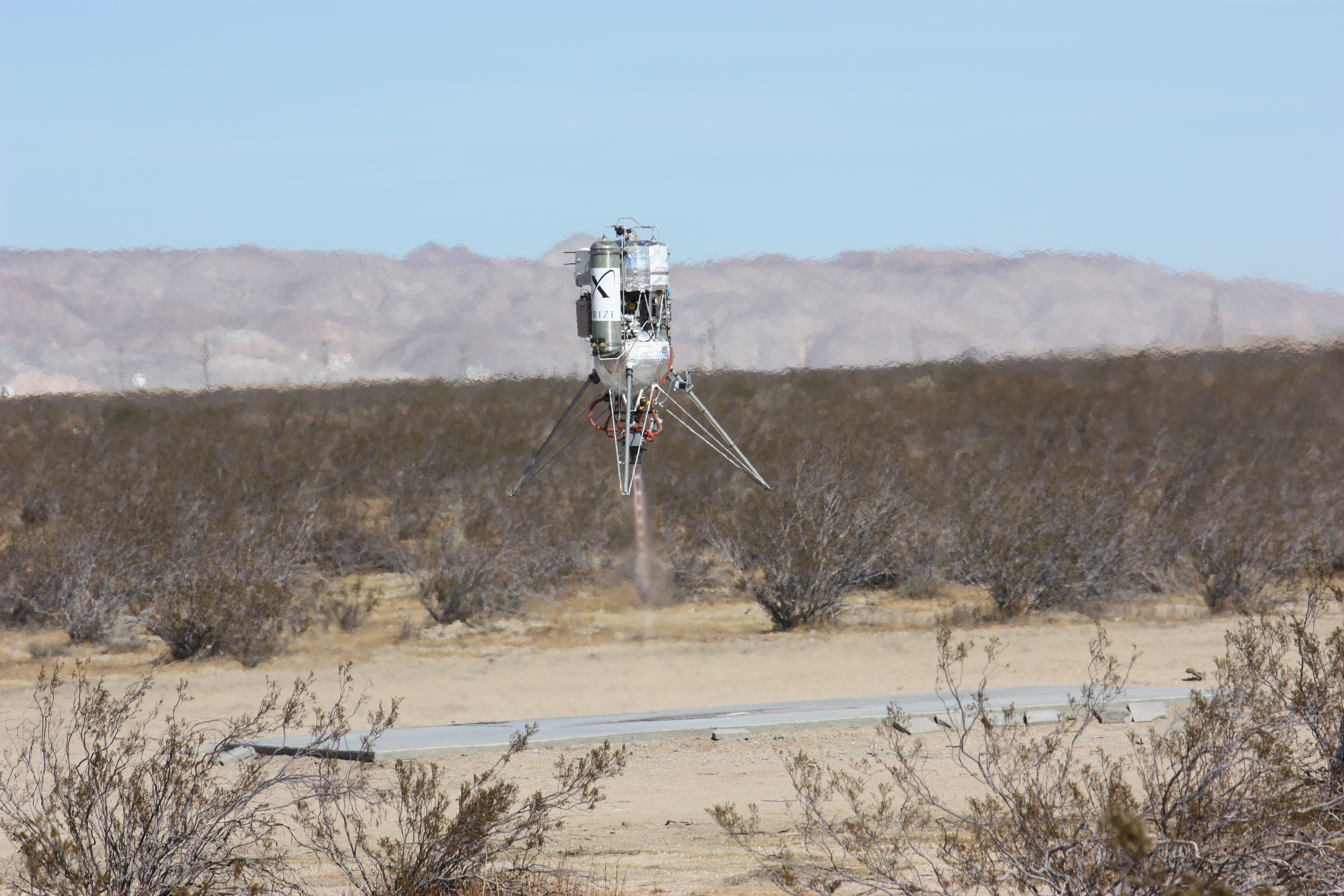
A XA0.1E "Xoie" rocket on the competition-winning landing in the Lunar Lander Challenge at Mojave on 30 October 2009.

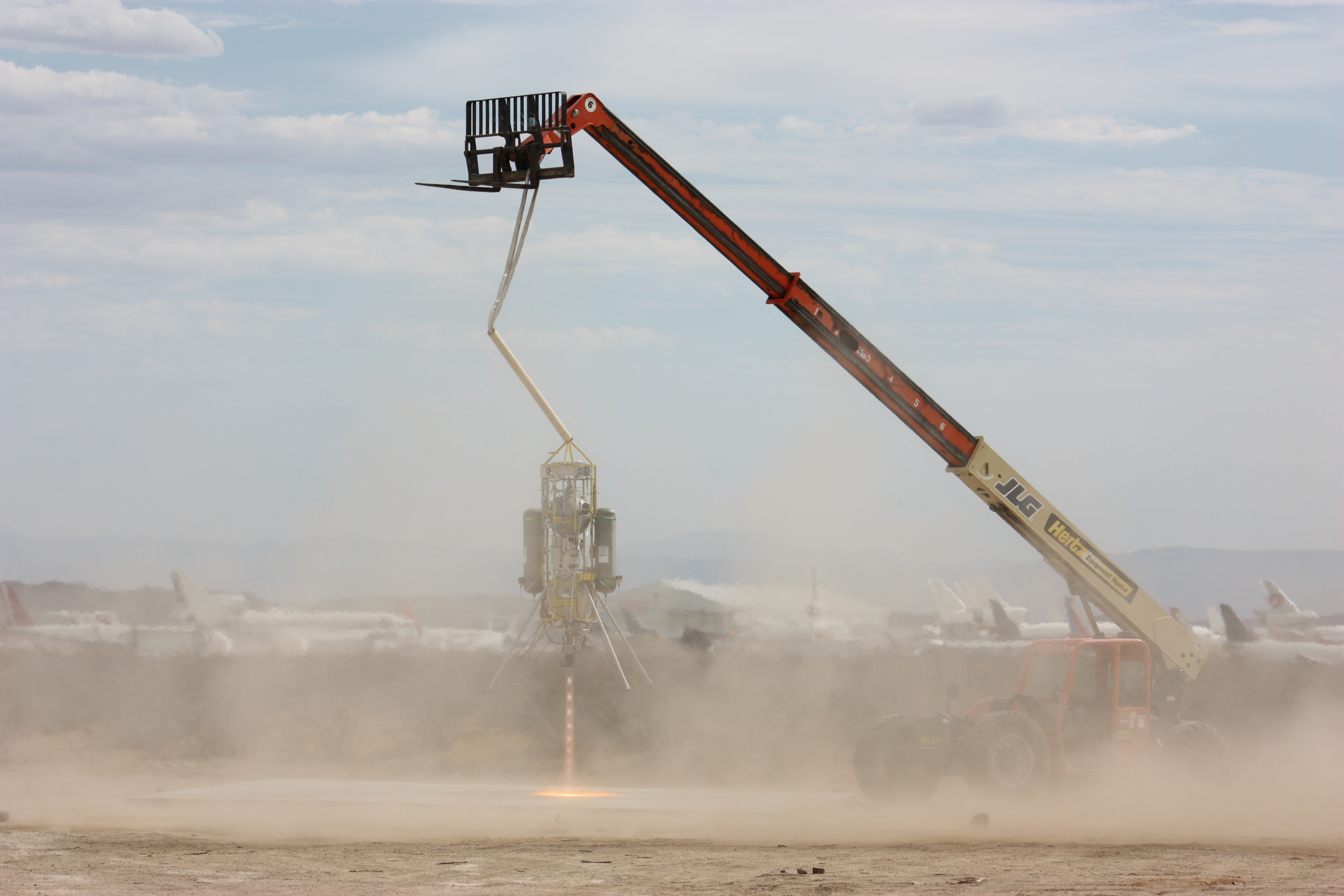
A XA0.1B "Xombie" lander tethered flight test on 11 September 2009.

Masten Space Systems was an aerospace manufacturer startup company in Mojave, California (formerly in Santa Clara, California) that was developing a line of vertical takeoff, vertical landing (VTVL) rockets, initially for uncrewed research sub-orbital spaceflights and eventually intended to support robotic orbital spaceflight launches.

In 2020, NASA awarded Masten a contract for a lunar lander mission; NASA was to pay Masten US$75.9 million for Masten to build and launch a lander called XL-1 to take NASA and other customer payloads to the south pole of the Moon. Masten Mission One would have been Masten's first space flight; it was scheduled for launch in November 2023.

The company filed for Chapter 11 bankruptcy in July 2022, and was later acquired by Astrobotic Technology in September 2022. Its operations continue as "Astrobotic's Propulsion and Test Department".

== Overview ==
Masten Space Systems was a Mojave, California based rocket company that was developing a line of reusable VTVL spacecraft, and related rocket propulsion hardware.

Masten Space Systems competed in the NASA and Northrop Grumman Lunar Lander Challenge X Prize in 2009, winning the level one second prize of US$150,000 and the level two first prize of US$1,000,000. On 2 November 2009, it was announced that Masten Space Systems had won first place in the level two category, with Armadillo Aerospace coming in second.

Masten Space Systems was selected for the Lunar CATALYST initiative of the NASA on 30 April 2014.

Masten was accepted to make a bid for NASA's Commercial Lunar Payload Services (CLPS) program on 29 November 2018. Masten proposed to NASA that Masten would develop a lunar lander called XL-1 to take scientific payload to the Moon. NASA accepted this proposal to be assessed, whether it would be developed or not, as part of the CLPS program. NASA would later choose which of the bids made for CLPS program by the various companies eligible to bid for CLPS the agency would eventually fund for development.

On 8 April 2020, it was announced that NASA had selected Masten's CLPS bid to be developed. NASA awarded Masten a $75.9 million contract to build, launch, land and operate their XL-1 Moon lander. The lander would take payload from NASA and other customers to the south pole of the Moon. Masten Mission One, the first XL-1 lander, was scheduled for launch in November 2023.

Masten Space Systems filed for Chapter 11 bankruptcy on July 28, 2022. The company's assets were purchased for US$4.5 million by Astrobotic Technology on September 8, 2022, who continues to operate the company's test vehicles.

=== Xombie ===
Masten's Xombie (model XA-0.1B) won the US$150,000 second prize in the Level One competition of the Lunar Lander Challenge on 7 October 2009 with an average landing accuracy of 16 centimetres (6.3 in).

The primary goal of these two airframes was to demonstrate stable, controlled flight using a GN&C system developed in-house at Masten. XA-0.1B originally featured four engines with 1,000 pounds-force (4 kN) thrust, but was converted in Spring 2009 to be powered by one engine of 750 pounds-force (3 kN) thrust. By October 2009, the regeneratively cooled isopropyl alcohol and liquid oxygen rocket engine was running at around 900 pounds-force (4 kN).

XA-0.1B, nicknamed "Xombie", first flew free of tether 19 September 2009, and qualified for the Lunar Lander Challenge Level One second prize of $150,000 on 7 October 2009.

In October 2016, NASA reported using Xombie to test the Landing Vision System (LVS), as part of the Autonomous Descent and Ascent Powered-flight Testbed (ADAPT) experimental technologies, for the Mars 2020 mission landing. After seeing Masten's success with Xombie in-air relight and vertical landing, SpaceX began evaluating this technique for use on the Falcon 9 booster.

As of 7 March 2017, Xombie had flown 224 times.

=== Xoie ===
Masten's Xoie (model XA-0.1E) won the US$1,000,000 Level Two prize of the Lunar Lander Challenge on October 30, 2009. They beat Armadillo Aerospace by just a bit more than 24 inches (610 mm) of total landing accuracy, with an average accuracy of about 7.5 inches (190 mm) on the two landings in the round-trip competition flight.

Xoie had an aluminum frame and featured a version of Masten's 750 pounds-force (3 kN) thrust engine that produced around 1,000 pounds-force (4 kN) of thrust. "Xoie", as the craft was nicknamed, qualified for the Lunar Lander Challenge level two on October 30, 2009.

=== Xaero ===
The Xaero reusable launch vehicle was a vertical-takeoff, vertical-landing (VTVL) rocket which was being developed by Masten in 2010–2011. It was proposed to NASA as a potential suborbital reusable launch vehicle (sRLV) for carrying research payloads under NASA's Flight Opportunities Program (initially known as the Commercial Reusable Suborbital Research/CRuSR program), projecting 30 kilometres (19 mi) altitude in initial flights of five to six minutes duration, while carrying a 10 kilograms (22 lb) research payload. It was propelled by the 1,150 pounds-force (5.1 kN) Cyclops-AL-3 rocket engine burning isopropyl alcohol and liquid oxygen.

The first Xaero test vehicle flew 110 test flights before being destroyed in its 111th flight. During the record-setting flight on 11 September 2012, an engine valve stuck open during descent, and this was sensed by the control system. As designed, the flight termination system was triggered, destroying the vehicle before it could create a range safety problem. The final test flight was intended to test the vehicle at higher wind loads and altitudes, flying to an altitude of one kilometer while testing the flight controls at the higher ascent and descent velocities before returning to a precise landing point. The ascent and initial portion of the descent was nominal, prior to the stuck throttle valve which resulted in the termination of the flight prior to the planned precision landing.

=== Xaero-B ===
Xaero-B was a follow-up to Xaero with the ability to reach 6 kilometres (3.7 mi) altitude with engine on throughout. Xaero-B was between 15 and 16 feet tall where Xaero was 12 feet tall. Xaero-B performed hot-fire testing and test flights. It would have been used for the bulk of research flights up to initial altitudes between 20 kilometres (12 mi) to 30 kilometres (19 mi). The vehicle has now been retired due to damage on a test flight in April 2017. It flew 75 times.

=== Xodiac ===
The Xodiac was a VTVL rocket introduced in 2016. It featured pressure-fed LOX/IPA propellant, and a regeneratively cooled engine. Flights could simulate landing on the Moon or Mars. Video of Xodiac performing in-flight air flow tests Tuft strings. Xodiac was lost during its 176th flight due to an in-flight anomaly on May 28, 2025.

=== Xogdor ===
Xogdor was a VTVL vehicle that Masten planned to introduce in 2023. As the sixth VTVL testbed developed at Masten, Xogdor would have improved upon the work done with Xodiac and tested descent and landing technologies at speeds up to 447 mph (719 km/h).

=== Xeus ===
Xeus (pronounced Zeus) was a vertical-landing, vertical-takeoff lunar lander demonstrator. Xeus consisted of a Centaur upper stage (from United Launch Alliance) with RL10 main engine to which four Katana vertical thrusters have been added. Production Xeus was estimated to be able to land on the Moon with up to 14 tonnes (revised to 10 tonnes) payload when using the expendable version or 5 tonnes payload when using the reusable version.

The damaged Centaur on the demonstrator Xeus limited it to Earth flights. The production versions would have to have been manufacturing fault free and certified for space operations. Human rating might also have been needed. United Launch Alliance, supplier of the Centaur, referred to Xeus as an abbreviation for eXperimental Enhanced Upper Stage. Further details of the proposed design were given in the paper "Experimental Enhanced Upper Stage (XEUS): An affordable large lander system".

Each of the Katanas used on a Xeus lander were likely to produce 3,500 pounds-force (16 kN) when performing a horizontal touchdown. In December 2012, Masten demonstrated their all-aluminum 2,800 pounds-force (12 kN) regeneratively-cooled engine, the KA6A.

The talk in this video announced the Xeus and also showed NASA's Space Exploration Vehicle rover with its two astronauts as a possible payload for the XEUS.

On 30 April 2014, the NASA announced that Masten Space Systems was one of the three companies selected for the Lunar CATALYST initiative. NASA signed an unfunded Space Act Agreement (SAA) with Masten in September 2014. The SAA lasts until August 2017, has 22 milestones and calls for "End-to-end demonstration of hardware and software that enables a commercial lander on the Moon."

In December 2015, United Launch Alliance (ULA) were planning to upgrade the XEUS's main body from a Centaur Upper Stage to the Advanced Cryogenic Evolved Stage (ACES) which they were developing, significantly increasing the payload. Masten Space intended to incorporate experience from developing the XL family of cargo landers into the XEUS family of landers.

In August 2016, ULA's president and CEO said ULA intended to human rate both the Vulcan and ACES.

=== XL-1 ===
The XL-1 was a small cargo lunar lander that Masten was developing as part of the Lunar CATALYST program (SAAM ID 18250). When powered by MXP-351 the XL-1 was designed to land 100 kilograms (220 lb) payloads onto the surface of the Moon.

As of August 2017, Masten Space expected the XL-1 to have four main engines which were being prototyped on the XL-1T and a wet mass of about 2,400 kilograms (5,300 lb).

On 11 October 2016, Masten Space Tweeted a video showing the test firing of its new bi-propellant combination, internally called MXP-351. The test used an existing engine with an experimental injector, the first 'Machete', producing 225 pounds-force (1.00 kN) thrust. Development of their 3D printed regen lunar engine that would use MXP-351 to land on the Moon continued. As of March 2017, a 1,000 pounds-force (4.4 kN) thrust version of Machete for the terrestrial testbed of the lander, dubbed XL-1T, was being manufactured.

In October 2017, NASA extended the Lunar CATALYST agreement for 2 years.

On 29 November 2018, it was announced that Masten was eligible to bid at a Commercial Lunar Payload Services (CLPS) contract by NASA. Should the proposal be accepted by NASA to be built, the landing to Moon would be no earlier than 2021.

On 8 April 2020, NASA selected Masten to deliver eight payloads – with nine science and technology instruments – to the South Pole of the Moon in 2022 with the XL-1 lander. Masten would also operate the payloads, helping to lay the foundation for human expeditions to the lunar surface beginning in 2024. The payloads, which included instruments to assess the composition of the lunar surface, test precision landing technologies, and evaluate the radiation on the Moon, were being delivered under NASA's Commercial Lunar Payload Services (CLPS) initiative as part of the agency's Artemis program. The US$75.9 million award included end-to-end services for delivery of the instruments, including payload integration, launch from Earth, landing on the surface of the Moon, and operation for at least 12 days. The payloads had predominantly been developed through two recent NASA Provided Lunar Payloads (NPLP) and Lunar Surface Instrument and Technology Payloads (LSITP) solicitations.

On 26 August 2020, Masten announced that the first XL-1 mission, Masten Mission One, would be launched by SpaceX, although it was not at the time publicly known which SpaceX launch vehicle it would fly on.

On 23 June 2021, Masten announced that the launch of Masten Mission One had been delayed to November 2023 due to COVID-19 pandemic related issues.

=== XL-1T ===
The XL-1T was a (T)errestrial technology and process demonstrator for the XL-1 and XEUS. A terrestrial flying test-bed was being used since lack of vehicle access to lunar landers after launch would make Masten's incremental design and test development methodology difficult and very expensive. Like the XL-1, the XL-1T was under development in partnership with NASA CATALYST (SAAM ID 18250).

The XL-1T was expected to have a dry mass of 588.93 kg and a wet mass of 1270.68 kg which was less than the XL-1. The vehicle had 4 off Machete 4400 N main engines able to throttle between 25% and 100% (4:1). The propellant was MPX-351. Yaw and pitch were controlled by differential throttling. There were 4 off 22 N ACS thrusters to control roll.

Many characteristics of the XL-1T were deliberately made similar to the XL-1. These included multi-engine architecture, avionics, software, fuel, movement of inertia, slosh management, and mission design tools.

=== XS-1 ===
Masten was awarded a US$3 million contract from DARPA to develop the XS-1 experimental spaceplane. Project ended as DARPA awarded the Phase 2 to Boeing.

== Other products and services ==
In addition to its line of vehicles, Masten Space Systems was offering its internally developed igniters and engines commercially to interested and qualified parties. Masten also had stated its intent at multiple conferences to participate in technology maturation and proof of concept projects.

=== Broadsword ===
Broadsword
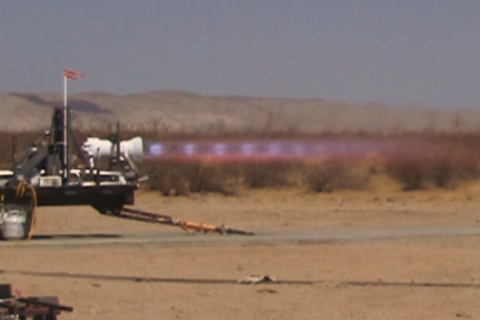
- A hotfire testing of 25,000 pounds-force (110 kN) liquid oxygen/liquid methane Broadsword thrust chamber on 30 September 2016.
- Country of origin: United States
- Manufacturer: Masten Space Systems
- Application: To provide a lower-cost reusable launch service for the CubeSat and smallsat launch market
- Status: Prototype

Liquid-fuel engine
- Propellant: LOX / Methane

Performance
- Thrust, vacuum: 35,000 pounds-force (160 kN) (estimate)
- Thrust, sea-level: 25,000 pounds-force (110 kN)
- Throttle range: To be determined
- Specific impulse, sea-level: To be determined

Dimensions
- Measurement: To be determined
- Length: To be determined
- Diameter: To be determined
- Dry mass: To be determined

Broadsword was a 25,000 pounds-force (110 kN) methane/liquid oxygen rocket engine Masten Space Systems was developing for the US government. Advanced manufacturing techniques would permit the engine to be used to provide a lower-cost reusable launch service for the growing CubeSat and smallsat launch market. The prototype engine took 1.5 months to construct and was made of aluminium. The engine consisted of 3 parts that were bolted together. The engine used an expander cycle and was planned to produce 35,000 pounds-force (160 kN) with a bell extension in vacuum.

The development of a technology demonstration unit was completed in September 2016. The hot-fire test campaign concluded with the demonstration of six successful engine starts.

As of 2017, a second development unit containing enhancements was being developed for NASA under the Tipping Point program with the aim of being flight qualified.

=== Cutlass ===
Cutlass
- Country of origin: USA
- Date: Start April 2016
- Manufacturer: Masten Space Systems
- Application: Mars ascent engine with in-space propulsion capabilities
- Associated LV: 65,000 lbf + LOX/methane booster Broadsword engine for Xephyr
- Status: Development put on hold

Liquid-fuel engine
- Propellant: LOX / Methane

Performance
- Thrust: 25,000 lbf (110 kN)
- Throttle range: To be determined
- Specific impulse, vacuum: To be determined
- Restarts: Yes

Dimensions
- Measurement: To be determined
- Length: To be determined
- Diameter: To be determined
- Dry mass: To be determined

Cutlass was a 25,000 pounds-force (110 kN) methane/liquid oxygen rocket engine Masten Space Systems was developing for the US government. Built using aluminium alloy via additive manufacturing techniques. Cutlass evolved into a low cost expendable upper stage engine using a gas generator cycle. A Phase 2 SBIR grant was not awarded so development was put on hold.

=== Katana ===
Katana class engines were designed to produce up to 4,000 pounds-force (18 kN) of thrust and to be regeneratively cooled. They were designed for indefinite runtime and good throttle response. A video of the all aluminium Katana KA6A Regen 2800 lbf engine's shake down test burning LOX/IPA (Isopropyl alcohol).

=== Machete ===
Machete
- Country of origin: USA
- Manufacturer: Masten Space Systems
- Application: To provide an additively manufactured bipropellant engine for the XL-1 lunar lander
- Status: Prototype

Liquid-fuel engine
- Propellant: MXP-351 (bipropellant)

Performance
- Thrust: 1,000 pounds-force (4.4 kN)
- Throttle range: 4:1
- Specific impulse, vacuum: 322 seconds
- Specific impulse, sea-level: 180 seconds
- Restarts: Yes

Dimensions
- Measurement: To be determined
- Length: To be determined
- Diameter: To be determined
- Dry mass: To be determined

Used in
- XL-1T

Machete was the name for a family of throttleable rocket engine designs Masten Space Systems was developing to permit their XL-1 lunar lander to land on the Moon. The Machete rocket engines burned the nontoxic storable hypergolic propellant combination MXP-351. The first Machete had an experimental injector design that was used to test MXP-351 in 2016, producing a thrust of 225 lbf. As of March 2017, Masten was modifying the design to make the engines additively-manufactured with regeneratively-cooled thrust chambers. Machete engines were being scaled up to produce 1000 lb thrust for a terrestrial test-bed version dubbed (XL-1T).

=== MXP-351 ===
MXP-351 was Masten Space's internal name for a self-igniting bipropellant combination invented to fuel its small lunar landers. Unlike the traditional NTO/MMH bipropellant, the two propellant chemicals in MXP-351 were safer to handle because they are nontoxic. The bipropellant could also be stored at room temperatures, unlike liquid oxygen and liquid hydrogen. The hypergolic combination had an ISP of 322 seconds. The storage life of MXP-351 before use was undergoing long-term studies but was expected to be a few years. The reduced operation constraints might have permitted a reduction in recurring operating costs.

Masten Space used similar precautions when handling MXP-351 to those used for HTP (High-Test Peroxide). These included wearing splash protection clothing plus a simple chemical respirator. They claimed that spills could be rectified by diluting with water and rinsing away.

=== Masten Mission One ===
Masten Space Systems was to launch a lunar lander mission called Masten Mission One or MM1 in November 2023, using a SpaceX Falcon 9 or Falcon Heavy launch vehicle. It was to have a suite of payloads for NASA.

== See also ==
- Artemis program (NASA lunar program)
- Armadillo Aerospace
- Blue Origin
- Commercial Lunar Payload Services (CLPS - NASA contract to deliver cargo to the Moon)
- Interorbital Systems
- Kankoh-maru launcher
- List of private spaceflight companies
- Lockheed Martin X-33
- Lunar Lander Challenge
- Lunar CATALYST
- McDonnell Douglas DC-X
- Quad (rocket)
- Reusable Vehicle Testing program of the Japanese Space Agency JAXA
- SpaceX
- VentureStar
- Zarya spacecraft
