= Third Reich (disambiguation) =

The Third Reich is another name for Nazi Germany.

Third Reich may also refer to:

== Books ==
- Das dritte Reich, a 1923 political book by Arthur Moeller van den Bruck
- The Third Reich (novel), a novel by Chilean author Roberto Bolaño published posthumously in 2010
- The Third Reich Series, a 1988–1991 series of illustrated history books published by Time-Life Books
- The Third Reich Trilogy, a 2003–2008 series of narrative history books by British historian Richard J. Evans

== Games ==
- Rise and Decline of the Third Reich, a board game also known as Third Reich
  - Computer Third Reich, a 1992 video game adaptation of the board game
  - Third Reich (video game), a 1996 video game adaptation of the board game

== See also ==
- Reich (disambiguation)
- Fourth Reich (disambiguation)
