= Reich (surname) =

Reich (English: /raɪʃ/ RYSHE, German: [ʁaɪç]) is a German surname that may refer to:

- Béla Rajki-Reich (1909–2000), Hungarian swimming coach and water polo coach
- Charles A. Reich (1928–2019), American professor of law and writer
- Christopher Reich (born 1961), American author
- David Reich (disambiguation), multiple people
- Eli Thomas Reich (1913–1999), Vice-Admiral of the US Navy
- Ferdinand Reich (1799–1882), German chemist
- Frank Reich (born 1961), American football player and coach
- Günter Reich (1921–1989), German-Israeli baritone
- Georges Reich (1926–2013), American actor and dancer
- Herman Reich (1917–2009), American baseball player and manager
- Jens Reich (born 1939), German scientist and civil rights campaigner
- Jeremy Reich (born 1979), Canadian ice hockey player
- Jim Reich (born 1942), American racing driver
- Karl Reich (1871-1944), German aviculturist
- Leon Reich (1879–1929), Polish lawyer and politician
- Lilly Reich (1885–1947), German modernist designer
- Marcel Reich-Ranicki (1920–2013), German literary critic
- Marco Reich (born 1977), German association football player
- Markus Reich (1844-1911), Jewish German deaf educator
- Michael Reich (born 1945), Polish-born economist
- Otto Reich (born 1945), Cuban-American diplomat
- Robert Reich (born 1946), American political commentator, college professor, and former Secretary of Labor
- Sam Reich (born 1984), American producer, director, writer, actor, and performer
- Sarah Reich (born 1989), American tap dance instructor, choreographer and performer
- Stephen C. Reich (1971–2005), American soldier and Minor League Baseball player
- Steve Reich (born 1936), American composer of classical music
- Steven Reich, American attorney
- Wilhelm Reich (1897–1957), Austrian-American psychiatrist, psychoanalyst and founder of orgonomy
- Zinaida Reich (1894–1939), Russian actress

People with surnames derived from Reich:

- Anton Reicha (1770–1836), Czech composer
- Irma Reichová (1859–1930), Czech operatic soprano
- Kathy Reichs (born 1948), American crime writer, forensic anthropologist and academic

== See also ==
- Reicher (disambiguation)
- Riech (surname)
- Rench (name)
- Reich (disambiguation)
