= Decline and Fall of the Third Reich =

Decline and fall of the Third Reich may refer to

- the Collapse of the Third Reich
- Rise and Decline of the Third Reich, a board wargame
- Rise and Fall of the Third Reich, a nonfiction book
