= Hans Julius Duncker =

German ornithologist, geneticist and eugenicist (1881–1961)

- Born: 26 May 1881; Ballenstedt, Anhalt, German Empire
- Died: 22 December 1961 (aged 80); Saarbrücken, Saarland, West Germany
- Occupations: ornithologist, geneticist and eugenicist

Hans Julius Duncker (26 May 1881 – 22 December 1961) was a German ornithologist, geneticist and eugenicist. Among his attempts in bird genetics was to produce a red canary by transfer of the red plumage gene from a red siskin.

== Early life and career ==
Duncker was born in Ballenstedt to businessman and judge Ernst Eduard Heinrich (born 1848) and Marigrita (Marie Elisabeth) Uhde (born 1847 in Valparaiso). He grew up in Dessau where he went to the Herzogliches Friedrichs-Gymnasium. He completed a PhD in zoology from the University of Göttingen in 1905. He received a Petsche-Labarre Prize in 1905 for work on bird migration. On 5 October 1907 he married Elsa Zwerusmann (born 4 June 1884) in Dessau. He joined Bremen Realgymnasium as a teacher of natural sciences and mathematics in 1909. In 1912 he became a member of the German Ornithological Society. In 1921, he began to work with canary breeder Karl Reich, the first person to make recordings of bird song and who was well known for creating a strain of canaries that sang Nightingale (Luscinia megarhynchos) songs. Reich claimed a Lamarckian view that he had somehow got the song into the genes of the canaries but Duncker interpreted this differently. Duncker suggested that Reich had selected for better learning in the canaries which were exposed to nightingale songs either from nightingales, their recordings, or from other canaries that had learned the nightingale songs.

In the early 1920s, he began conducting several breeding experiments on birds to study the heritability of plumage colors and structures, such as the hood. He studied the genetics of canaries and attempted to produce a red canary through hybridization with the red siskin. From 1925 Duncker collaborated with the wealthy businessman and aviculturist Carl Hubert Cremer and extended his experiments to include budgerigars. He contributed regularly to the Journal of Ornithology and other ornithological journals. In 1927 he established a journal Vogel ferner Länder (which later became AZ-Vogelinfo) and in 1928 he published a book on canary genetics Genetik der Kanarienvögel.

Under the Weimar Republic, Duncker headed a local Bremen group of the German society for Racial Hygiene. He organized lectures on Nazi racial policy. He himself was a eugenicist who recommended forced sterilization of the disabled. In 1934, he published a book Neue Ziele und Wege des Biologieunterrichts on teaching biology along with Friedrich Lange. He was a member of the NSLB and Stahlhelm from 1933 and became a member of the NSDAP only on January 1, 1941 (number 8,346,434). After the Allied occupation, he was interviewed and was classified as a "follower" (Mitlaeufer) on April 7, 1948. Although he had supported sterilization of the intellectually disabled, he had never personally discriminated against the Jews. He retired as a teacher and worked on the bird collection of the Bremen Overseas Museum.
