= International Lunar Observatory =

Planned observatory on the moon

International Lunar Observatory (ILO)
- Names: ILO-1 (Flagship Mission to Lunar South Pole, launching 2026-27 TBD) ILO-2 (Backup Mission, TBD)
- Mission type: Technology, Astronomy
- Operator: International Lunar Observatory Association (ILOA Hawai'i)
- Website: https://iloa.org/the-ilo-mission/

Spacecraft properties
- Spacecraft type: TBD
- Manufacturer: Lander: TBD; Telescope: Canadensys Aerospace

Start of mission
- Launch date: 2026-27 (planned)
- Rocket: TBD
- Launch site: TBD
- Contractor: TBD

Moon lander

Main telescope
- Name: ILO-1
- Type: TBD

The International Lunar Observatory (ILO) is a private scientific and commercial lunar mission by the International Lunar Observatory Association (ILOA Hawai'i) of Kamuela, Hawaii to place a permanent observatory near the South Pole of the Moon to conduct astrophysical studies using an optical telescope and possibly an antenna dish. The mission aims to prove a conceptual design for a lunar observatory that would be reliable, low cost, and fast to implement. A precursor mission, ILO-X consisting of two small imagers (totaling less than 0.6 kg), launched on 15 February 2024 aboard the Intuitive Machines IM-1 mission to the Moon south pole region. It is hoped to be a technology precursor to a future observatories on the Moon, and other commercial initiatives.

The ILO-1 mission is being organized by the International Lunar Observatory Association and the Space Age Publishing Company. It was planned to be launched in 2008 with development by SpaceDev, and was first delayed to 2013. The prime contractors originally were Moon Express, providing the MX-1E lander, and Canadensys Aerospace, providing the optical telescope system. The estimated cost in 2004 was of US$50 million.

== Overview ==
The ILO-1 mission, was later scheduled to be launched in July 2020 with an Electron rocket from New Zealand. The mission was called Moon Express Lunar Scout, and it would have used the MX-1E lander to deliver the observatory on top of the Malapert Mountain, a 5 km tall peak in the Aitken Basin region that has an uninterrupted direct line of sight to Earth, which facilitates communications any time. The original launch of the MX-1E lander with an Electron rocket was cancelled sometime before February 2020; no launch date or launch rocket for the MX-1E has been since announced, leaving the status of it unknown. The ILO-1 flagship payload, and its back up ILO-2, is still being advanced through work by Canadensys Aerospace Corporation (March 2024) while ILOA seeks a different landing provider and partner to land on Malapert Mountain.

On July 2, 2025, ILOA Hawai'i announced its selection of Venturi Astrolab FLEX rover to carry the ILO-1 payload to the Moon South Pole region. The mission is set to launch no earlier than December 2026, and operate on the lunar surface for 1-6 years.

The small robotic ILO-1 observatory is designed to withstand the long lunar nights so it is expected to operate for a few years. Moon Express would have also utilized the mission to explore the Moon's South Pole for mineral resources including water ice. The original plan for the ILO-1 included an optical portion of the system is a Schmidt–Cassegrain telescope. That optical system uses a 7 cm diameter lens, with an 18 cm focal plane, a 13 cm f/5.6 aperture, and 6.4-megapixel resolution. The telescope system would have been "about the size of a shoe-box" with a mass of approximately 2 kg.

Some collaborators include the National Astronomical Observatory of China (NAOC), Indian Space Research Organisation (ISRO), the newly formed Southeast Asia Principal Operating Partnership, and others.

== ILO-X precursor ==
An ILO-X Precursor instruments were launched on the Intuitive Machines Nova-C IM-1 mission on 15 February 2024. IM-1 landed on the Moon on 22 February, about halfway through the lunar day. Since the lander is unprotected from the cold lunar night, it was only expected to operate until sunset, about seven earth days. ILO-X includes both wide-field and narrow-field imaging systems. The narrow field-of-view imager was named "Ka 'Imi" (To Search) after a student won the Moon Camera Naming Contest held statewide in Hawai'i from March–May 2022. There was an auction to name the wide field-of-view instrument which closed 22 March 2024 and resulted in the winning name Lunar Codex being proposed and accepted. ILOA released its first images from the ILO-X wide field-of-view imager to the public on 29 February 2024 which included one image taken during Deorbit, Descent and Landing (DDL) on 22 February 2024 about 4.2 minutes prior to touchdown which occurred 23:24 UTC, and another image post-landing taken at about 00:30 UTC on 25 February 2024 which shows portions of the lunar landscape, regolith / dust, the Sun, and the IM-1 Odysseus lunar lander. The company received a total of 16 high-res images and 322 thumbnails from the ILO-X imagers, but the mission did not fulfill its main astronomy mission goals to capture images of the Milky Way Galaxy or stars in the celestial sky due to off-nominal pointing of the lander. Also stored on the flash memory within the ILO-X instruments are digital assets (41 files, 2 copies of which were transmitted back to Earth from the Moon surface), which are documented on the commercial payloads/digital assets catalogue of the Space Artefacts site under search term "ILOA Moon Museum".

== ILO-C instrument ==
An ILO-C payload is planned to be launched aboard China's Chang'E-7 lunar lander around 2026. CNSA announced its solicitation for payloads onboard Chang’E-7 mission, from which the ILO-C proposal was selected to move forward. ILO-C "seeks to advance Galaxy imaging, 21st Century Astronomy / Science from the Moon and precursor proof-of-concept development for the ILO-1 flagship mission". It will be a small, wide-field optical telescope, produced in Beijing, China through a Memorandum of Understanding between International Lunar Observatory Association (ILOA), Hong Kong University (HKU), National Astronomical Observatories of Chinese Academy of Sciences (NAOC), and the National Astronomical Research Institute of Thailand (NARIT).

== Objective ==
The ILO-1 mission's objective is to conduct astrophysical observations from the surface of the Moon, whose lack of atmosphere eliminates much of the need for costly adaptive optics technology. Also, since the Moon's days (about fourteen Earth days) have a dark sky, it allows for nonstop astronomical observations. Disadvantages include micrometeorite impacts, cosmic and solar radiation, lunar dust, and temperature shifts as large as 350 °C. The mission aims to acquire images of galaxies, stars, planets, the Moon and Earth. The project will promote commercial access to the telescope use to schools, scientists and the public at large through the Internet.

== See also ==
- List of artificial objects on the Moon
- List of missions to the Moon
- Lunar Ultraviolet Cosmic Imager, a proposed lunar-based telescope
