= Reich (disambiguation) =

Reich is a German term for "realm" or "empire".

Reich may also refer to:

- Reich, Germany, a town in Rhineland-Palatinate
- Reich (board game), a 1979 board game about German Unification
- Reich (video game), a cancelled first-person shooter developed by UTV True Games
- Reich (surname)
- Das Reich (newspaper), a National Socialist newspaper

== See also ==
- Third Reich (disambiguation)
- Fourth Reich (disambiguation)
- Raich (disambiguation)
