= Fourth Reich (disambiguation) =

The Fourth Reich refers to a hypothetical future successor of Nazi Germany (Third Reich) or such ideas in neo-Nazism.

Fourth Reich may also refer to:

- The Fourth Reich (film), a 1990 South African film
- The Fourth Reich (EP), a 1982 EP by the Icelandic group Þeyr
- 4th Reich (game), a 1985 board wargame by Task Force Games
- "4th Reich", a song by the band Stratovarius from their 1994 album Dreamspace
- The Fourth Reich, within the New World Order conspiracy theory
- Fourth Reich (New Zealand gang)

== See also ==
- Reich (disambiguation)
