= Riech =

Riech is a surname. Notable people with the surname include:

- Nathan Riech (born 1995), Canadian Paralympic athlete
- Todd Riech, American Olympic athlete

== See also ==
- Reich (surname)
