= Computer Third Reich =

1992 video game

- Developer: Thalean Software
- Publisher: The Avalon Hill Game Co.
- Platforms: Amiga; Atari ST
- Release: 1992
- Genre: Strategy

Computer Third Reich is a computer wargame published in 1992 by The Avalon Hill Game Company.

== Gameplay ==
Computer Third Reich is a game in which the strategic warfare of World War II is simulated in the computer version of Rise and Decline of the Third Reich. The game allows two computer or human players simulate World War II in Europe, with one player as the Axis powers and the other as the Allies. The player uses the main screen to decide play options such as deployment limit, type of opponent player, speed of the computer, and which scenario to play. The player uses a mouse to move the counters across the board.

== Reception ==
Wyatt Lee reviewed the game for Computer Gaming World, and stated that "anyone ready to, as von Ribbentrop accused the Polish ambassador in March of '39, conduct diplomacy with a bayonet, should probably consider C3R as a viable option."

Alfred Charles Giovetti for Current Notes called it "a great game for a wargame newcomer to get the flavor of the game" and was happy that the computer takes over the rules and complexity for the player.

Jeff James for Amiga World stated that while the game lacks in amenities such as graphics and sound, this "is adequately compensated for by a solid, uncluttered playing interface and a healthy dose of gameplay".

Richard Mataka for Amazing Computer found that while the game "is easy to learn, it is difficult to master all of the game's subtle strategies" and noted that the game will be different each time it is played.

M. Evan Brooks for Computer Gaming World called the game's AI mediocre.

== Reviews ==
- Leicester Mercury

== See also ==
- Third Reich, a 1996 video game adaptation of the board game
