= Rench (name) =

Rench is a surname; some notable people named Rench include:

- Janice E. Rench (1939–2016), American social worker and writer
- Rick Rench (1941–2008), an American politician
- Aaron Rench, co-producer of The River Thief (2016)
- Alan Rench & the ViceGrips, a band created by Jeff Sherman
- Rench, a musician and member of Gangstagrass

== See also ==
- John Wrench
- Reich (surname)
