= Advanced Third Reich =

Board wargame

Advanced Third Reich (A3R - 1992) is a board wargame originally designed by Bruce Harper as a simulation of the European and African theatres of World War II. The game was published by Avalon Hill, who then sold the license to Hasbro, and was marketed as "the ultimate World War II strategy game". Advanced Third Reich is a rewrite of Rise and Decline of the Third Reich (1974), incorporating and developing many suggestions which had been published in The General since the early 1980s, improving ease of play and historical realism.

== Land warfare ==
A new map was included, similar to the old but larger, repainted by Charlie Kibler (albeit showing most land in a slightly odd desert yellow color) and Soviet units (which the rules wrongly insist on calling "Russian", although the USSR is correctly labelled on the map) are now red rather than brown. Helsinki is now a port (removing the need for Germany to place a corps there at the open), and the map now includes Iraq (which Britain must garrison against a possible revolt) and Kuwait.

The order of setup has been amended, so Germany no longer sets up last and is thus no longer able to launch devastating and far-fetched attacks on France or even, say, Yugoslavia, in the opening turn.

The airbase rules have been tidied up a little, to allow a player to "recycle" airbases already on the map by removing one each turn to place a new one.

Defence Modifiers (DMs) are now cumulative, so that a unit in mountains and behind a river is now quadrupled rather than simply tripled. Minor countries forces (except Finns and Swedes) now defend at -1 DM outside their homeland, making Romanian and Hungarian forces much weaker in the USSR. Infantry now defend against exploiting armour at -1 DM, i.e. at face value in clear terrain, although units never defend at less than face value. Overruns - attacks during movement - are now allowed (odds of 6:1 are needed), at a cost of 2 movement points and with a 1 in 6 chance of an "Exchange" result. All of this increases the offensive capacity of attackers, especially the Germans against weak Allied forces in the early years (one of the French 5-factor air wings no longer joins her force pool until Summer 1940, making French defeat by then almost inevitable), but on the Eastern Front spring mud (preventing overrun and exploitation there) and the Russian Winter (an annual die roll which improves for the Germans over time) mean that Germany only has a two-season attack in the East.

During an Attrition Option a player may conduct "limited offensives", paying for small attacks as needed, up to a total value of 14 BRP-worth of attacking units.

Bridgeheads - unless close to enemy units - are removed if no longer needed for supply. This prevents the German player from keeping bridgeheads in Warsaw or Paris as excuses for overstacking defenders years after the initial cross-river attack.

== Naval warfare ==
Naval combat now features a new, much more dynamic table. Some naval factors may be damaged in combat (factors damaged twice before they can withdraw are deemed to be sunk). Naval combat is now much more common, as strategic redeployment and sea escort of Strategic Redeployment (only 2 naval factors are now needed to sea escort each factor rather than an entire 9-factor fleet per unit) may now be intercepted. Naval interception is now automatic within 4 hexes, the range at which aircraft can be deemed to be active. There are quite complex rules for naval interception, as intercepting forces may themselves be intercepted, and so on almost ad infinitum.

Air attacks on naval units are now much more effective, and also use a new attack table. Air factors may attack a moving fleet once for each hex it traverses in range, or attack a fleet in combat once before each round of combat (British and German naval factors may stay for a second round of combat after losing the first). Nearby air factors may give air cover (with a +1 DRM as they engage the attacking air factors). Before each round of air attack, the naval units make a defence roll, which may destroy some attacking air factors or cause others to abort (those factors may still attack on the next round of combat). Attacks by small numbers of air factors are thus unlikely to be effective, but a full-sized 5-factor air unit can do lethal damage to a passing fleet. Air attacks on naval bases must first counterair any air factors present in the hex, the survivors then being added to the defence strength of the hex prior to the defence roll.

Naval reconstruction now takes place each turn without any delay, but each major power is limited as to how many factors she can rebuild in her shipyards (Britain may rebuild 1 factor in Canada each turn and 2 in Rosyth), so a steady stream of naval reconstruction is usual.

Invasions more than 6 hexes beyond the nearest friendly air base now require twice as many naval factors, making far-fetched Allied invasions up the Adriatic less feasible.

Murmansk Convoys are now covered in much more detail, with mini battles raging between air, surface factors and German submarines in the off-map box.

Britain has 5 submarine factors in Malta, which operate as if they were naval factors.

== Strategic warfare and logistics ==
Strategic warfare units are now cheaper and more plentiful, and combat now takes place each turn (only a quarter of them being used each turn, with a roll to determine how many BRP losses strategic warfare inflicts as a percentage of the maximum possible), with SR being reduced for countries which suffer strategic warfare losses (this particularly affects Britain in the mid-game). U-boats are more effective if Germany controls the French Atlantic ports, and even more so if Germany controls Gibraltar, but their effectiveness diminishes over time. Allied fleets may now be placed in the SW box, each counting as an ASW factor (although U-boats eliminate ASW factors in combat, excess losses do not sink Allied fleets); Germany may also send small groups of naval factors to sea as "raiders" (like Graf Spee or Bismarck); if they escape interception on their way out to sea they may engage in combat with the naval factors in the strategic warfare box, inflicting small losses and thus reducing Allied strategic warfare effectiveness as only complete 9-factor fleets count for U-Boat warfare (the rules explain this as disruption of convoy protection).

Separate British & Soviet partisans, appropriately coloured, are now included in the game, and only one out of each kind may be built in each country each turn (Greece and Yugoslavia might thus see separate pro-British and pro-Soviet partisans unable to co-operate with one another). Each partisan on the map - provided it is behind Axis lines - destroys 1 enemy BRP per turn, which over the course of a long game constitutes a drain on German resources.

For each turn in which she is deprived of oil, normally from the well at Ploesti in Romania, Germany suffers one new "oil effect" of her choice, gradually degrading her economy, air, armour, and navy.

Only Limited Supply may be traced from a minor or colonial capital, which basically means air may not fly and armour is treated as infantry (lower movement factor, may not exploit). This particularly affects Axis units in North Africa, unless the Axis manage to get air control of the Central Mediterranean to permit sea supply. British units in Egypt may trace full supply from Suez or Basra, and up to three British factors may be constructed in the Middle East each turn.

Certain Key Economic Areas (e.g. the Ruhr) cause loss of BRPs if controlled by the enemy.

== Diplomacy ==
Each major power receives a basic allowance of Diplomacy Points (DPs), and can purchase extra according to the size of her economic base, as well as receiving extra for control of certain geographical objectives. Almost an entire companion rule booklet is devoted to a menu of choices to which these can secretly be allocated (the main rules make clear that the worst blunders a player can make are diplomatic rather than military) - each player may then select a country each turn for a diplomatic roll. Belgium or Denmark may allow Germany free passage through their countries, Axis minors (including of course Finland, Romania, Hungary and Bulgaria but possibly also Spain, Turkey, Vichy France, Iraq, Egyptian rebels, an independent Ukraine or many others) must be activated and can later be deactivated by the Allies. Some minor countries can give some BRPs through "economic penetration" before being fully activated. Japan may be more or less active in the Pacific than in reality, affecting the speed at which the USA enters the war. The old "Foreign Aid" rules are now gone, but a later rule change allows players to conduct "covert operations" to negate any particularly lethal enemy diplomatic result.

As in previous versions of the game, Italy still enters the war at the discretion of the German player (unless there is a separate Italian player in a multi-player game).

The most game-bendingly powerful variants are now removed from the mix (e.g. Spain or Turkey joining the Axis - these can now be achieved by diplomacy, albeit with great difficulty, although as in reality Spain may send a token force to the Eastern Front). Variants now consist mainly of amendments to forcepools (e.g. German jet fighters, V1 flying bombs or V2 rockets, British commandos who may seize ports, or Soviets slightly stronger if Tukhachevsky escaped being purged) besides stalwarts like "Hitler Assassinated". The game now features twenty variants per side, with a recommendation that each side pick five to mix up the game a little. Enough extra units are now included to cover all possible diplomacy rolls and variant draws.

== British and Soviet surrender ==
Germany has no strategic bombers, but her air factors may bomb London - those which survive combat with the RAF (which receives +1 DRM for this kind of combat) each inflict 1 BRP loss. The losses from the Battle of Britain are usually quite minor but may be the nail in Britain's coffin, especially if an overenthusiastic British player has lost too many units in France in 1940. The increased effectiveness of air factors against fleets makes Britain more vulnerable to invasion, and in the middle years of the war, Britain often finds herself suffering BRP losses and reduced SRs from U-boats, and with many of her fleets pinned down defending the home islands or engaging in anti-submarine warfare, she may be greatly outnumbered by the Italian navy in the Mediterranean.

British surrender is determined by a special table, and is affected by BRP levels, loss of objectives and unbuilt units (it is thus usually a mistake to send too large an expeditionary force to France in 1940), and becomes less likely once the USA is in the war and deploys units to Britain. If Britain finds herself short of units or BRPs in late 1940, she may well be required to offer what the game calls a "low level surrender", i.e. ceasing hostilities and making a few minor concessions from a menu - as if, say, Lord Halifax rather than Winston Churchill had had his way in the May 1940 War Cabinet Crisis. (Germany may ignore such an offer and attempt to invade and conquer Britain. If this succeeds some free British forces may fight on from Canada).

A similar surrender table governs the USSR's surrender, although hostilities in the East will never entirely cease even if the Soviet regime is deemed to have fallen.

== USA and USSR ==
US-Axis Tensions (USAT) are determined by a separate table. There is a small automatic increase in USAT each turn, but they are further increased by U-boat activity, German DOWs and full offensives in the West, or invasion of Britain. Allied aggression against neutral countries reduces USAT. As tensions rise high enough a still technically neutral USA may spend DPs, grant BRPs to Britain and commit a few fleets to strategic warfare, mirroring the actual course of events in 1941. As in previous editions, the USA is still erroneously deemed to declare war on Germany when USAT reach 50, the opposite of what actually occurred. However, a shrewd German player can "game" the USAT table and keep the USA neutral by not declaring war on too many minor countries, taking only limited offensives or even hoarding her U-boats for a sudden, devastating assault on Britain's economy (the latter loophole came to light after publication, and the rules were later amended to require Germany to make at least limited use of any U-boats she builds).

The US economic base starts at 150 BRPs, but besides the usual percentage growth process grows automatically by 10 BRP per turn, then 20 BRP per turn after entering the war, so by 1944-5 the US economy will have grown to colossal size. American SR and initial deployment capacity are linked to the size of her base, while her forcepool increases in three tranches, at annual intervals after the USA enters the war (so most of the US forces will not reach Europe until 1944). US involvement, before and after her formal entry into the war, is thus a gradual process.

Whilst still neutral, besides occupying eastern Poland and the Baltic States, the USSR may make territorial demands of Finland and Romania, which may either fight a border war or back down and cede the territory. However, any increased Soviet activity displeases the neutral USA and reduces USAT.

Whilst the USSR is neutral, any German aggression in the East, including penetration of Balkan countries, triggers a Russian (sic) Reaction Roll, which may allow the Soviets to intervene and makes the eventual German attack of Summer 1941 less likely to achieve surprise (in which Soviet armour have no Zone of Control and infantry defend only at face value). The Designer's Notes explicitly state that this is to make the German player feel he has to launch Operation Barbarossa whilst he still has a chance of achieving surprise.

DPs may also be used to affect US-Axis Tensions and Russian Reaction.

The Soviets have a smaller base than in previous versions of the game but obtain most of their BRPs from Industrial Centres (ICs), which grow in value throughout the game (they may be captured or evacuated by SR to Siberia provided no German unit is too close). Besides this extra boost to her economy, extra armour and air units - added in small increments in 1942-3 - make the late war USSR much more powerful than in previous editions.

== Scenarios and newsletter ==
As well as the 1942 and 1944 scenarios included in the original game (although the German BRP totals in these have now been corrected), "Advanced Third Reich" also includes new 1940 and 1941 scenarios, as well as an introductory Barbarossa scenario, covering the German invasion of the USSR in 1941.

A quarterly newsletter, Ultra, is focused on strategy discussions on the play of AWAW. The first edition, a synopsis of the rules changes, came with the game; back issues from 1992 to 2002 are available that focused on A3R and ERS.

== Further development of the game system ==
Empire of the Rising Sun (1995) is a companion game, also developed by Bruce Harper, set in the Pacific Theater of Operations in World War II. A3R and ERS can be played separately or together in a "Global War" simulation, using rules that are part of the ERS package. By 1997 the development of a new version - originally entitled "Global War 2000" but eventually renamed "A World At War" - was underway ("Ultra" continued to be published online) and thereafter the original published version of "Advanced Third Reich" was referred to by aficionados as "classic". In 2003 GMT Games published a new Bruce Harper game, A World at War (AWAW), a substantially revamped, larger, and more complex version of the combined A3R and ERS.

== Reception ==
Dr. Robert J. Bunker reviewed Advanced Third Reich in White Wolf Inphobia #52 (Feb., 1995), rating it a 4.5 out of 5 and stated that "For the money, there's a lot of substance here. It's a quality product from design through production. The suggested retail price is steep, however. I suggest that friends pool their money to get it."

== Reviews ==
- Casus Belli #74
