= Karl Reich =

German canary breeder and aviculturist

Karl Reich (19 April 1871, Oldenburg (city) – 7 September 1944, Bremen) was a German businessman and aviculturist who kept nightingales and canaries at his aviary in Bremen. Along with Hans Duncker, he carried out breeding experiments on canaries. The first commercial gramophone records of bird songs included the songs of nightingales from his aviary. He had a nightingale sing into the horn of the recording equipment.

Reich was a businessman in Bremen and ran a hardware store. He lived on Am Wall.

Along with Karl Gustav Hartwig and Carl Röben, he was a founding member of the "Gesellschaft zum Schutze der heimischen Vögel" (lit. 'society for the conservation of native birds') on 17 March 1914. It later became the Bremer Naturschutzgesellschaft (BNG, lit. 'Bremen Nature Conservation Society').

Reich made young canaries listen to and learn nightingale songs. One of his canaries bred in 1911 had a very deep voice, and he was able to breed it and produce a strain of canaries that could sing nightingale songs.

In 1908, the oldest commercially issued gramophone record of a bird song was made, with recordings of Reich's captive nightingales. The His Master's Voice catalogue for it is, in part, "G.C.9439. Made by a captive nightingale. For the first time in the history of the Talking Machine industry, a genuine record has been obtained of a bird. The Nightingale in question is the property of Herr Carl Reich, of Berlin..."

The MoonArk includes a recording of nightingale song by Karl Reich.
