= OrbitBeyond =

Lunar exploration company

OrbitBeyond, Inc.
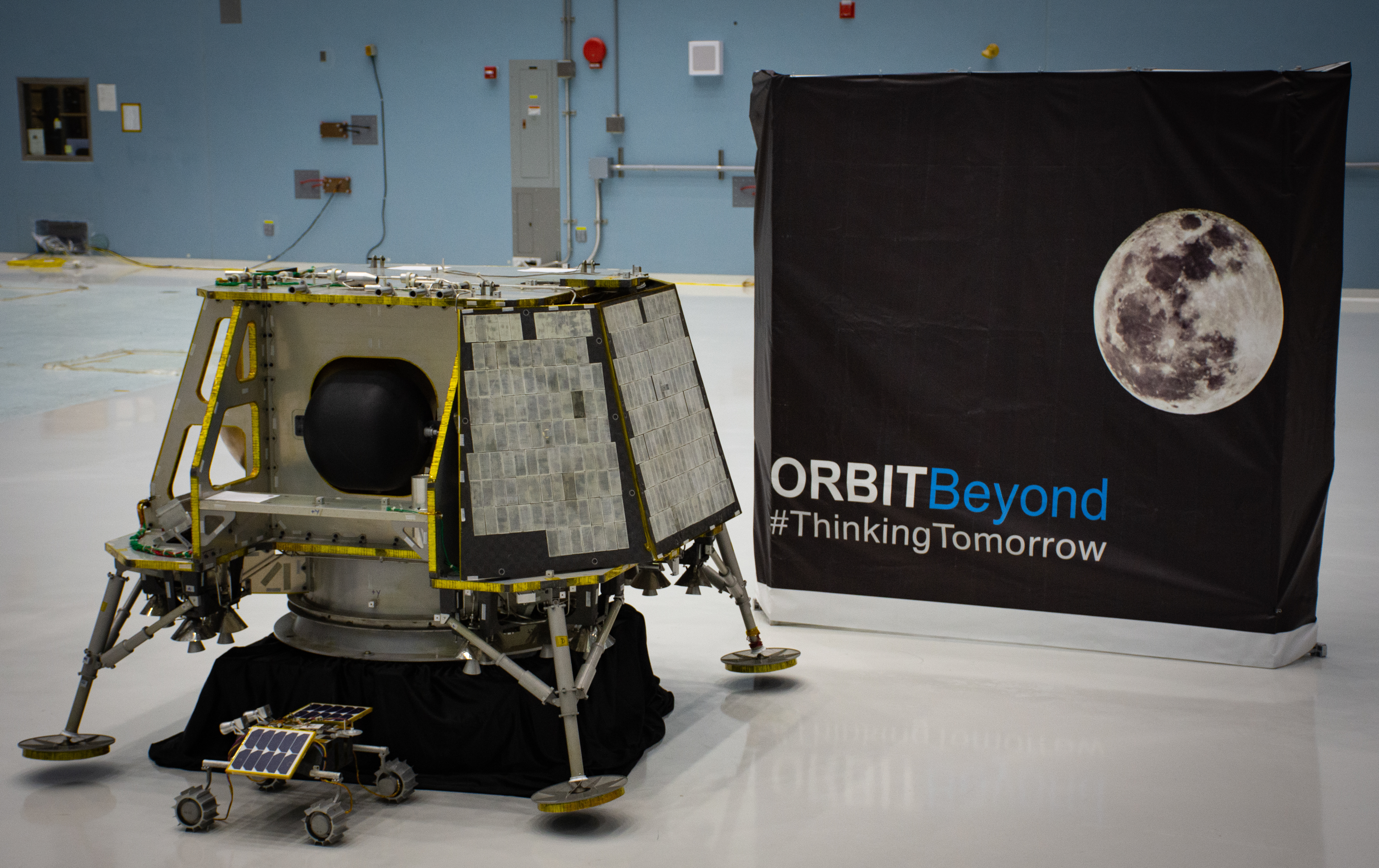
- Company type: Private
- Industry: Aerospace
- Founded: 2018
- Fate: Active
- Headquarters: Edison, New Jersey, US
- Key people: Siba Padhi (President); Jeff Patton; Jon Morse; Michael Kaplan; Abbas Salim
- Products: Robotic lunar landers and rovers
- Website: orbitbeyond.com

Orbit Beyond, Inc., usually stylized as ORBITBeyond, is an aerospace company that builds technologies for lunar exploration. Its products include configurable delivery lunar landers with a payload capacity of up to 300 kg (660 lb), and rovers.

== Overview ==
On November 29, 2018, ORBITBeyond was selected to bid robotic lander contracts from NASA's Commercial Lunar Payload Services (CLPS). ORBITBeyond has engaged former Google Lunar XPRIZE competitor TeamIndus (Axiom Research Labs) for lander engineering, Honeybee Robotics for payload integration, Advanced Space for mission management, and Ceres Robotics for surface operations. Their aim is to create collaborative and scalable spacecraft exploration platforms to support commercial market growth in the cislunar space.

On May 31, 2019, NASA announced that it had selected OrbitBeyond as one of three commercial partners to deliver NASA payloads to the Moon with its Z-01 lander in 2020 and 2021. OrbitBeyond was awarded $97 million to land NASA payloads in Mare Imbrium by September 2020. However, the company dropped out of this contract in July 2019, citing its inability to complete the missions on schedule. Orbit Beyond remains a CLPS contractor eligible to bid on future contracts.

== Spacecraft ==
Z-01
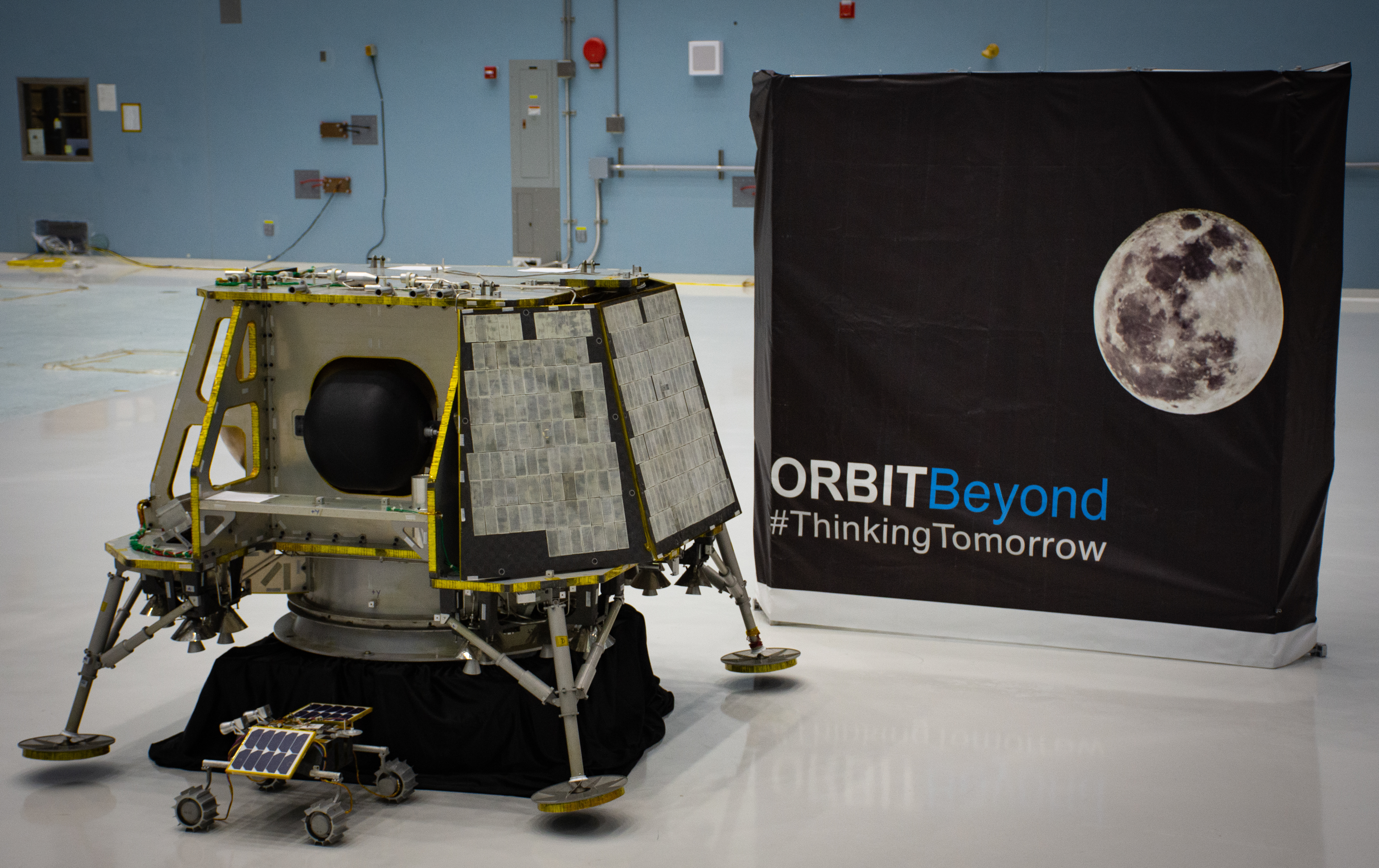
- Models of Z-01 lunar lander and ECA rover, 2019
- Manufacturer: Orbit Beyond
- Designer: Axiom Research Labs (TeamIndus)
- Country of origin: US
- Operator: Ceres Robotics
- Applications: Lunar lander

Specifications
- Spacecraft type: Robotic soft lander
- Dry mass: 210 kg (460 lb)
- Payload capacity: 40 kg (88 lb)

Production
- Status: In development
- On order: 0
- Built: 0
- Lost

Engine details
- Maximum thrust: one 440 N sixteen 22 N thrusters
- Propellant: Hydrazine

Related spacecraft
- Derived from: TeamIndus' HHK1

The company is developing two lunar landers, Z-01 and Z-02, and a small rover called ECA.

=== Z-01 ===
Z-01 is based on TeamIndus' lunar lander, previously known as HHK1. On its maiden mission it would carry up to 40 kg of commercial payloads. It features a main engine that produces 440 N, and sixteen 22 N thrusters for finer orbital maneuvers and attitude control (orientation). Its first mission was planned to launch in Q3 2020, on a Falcon 9 rocket but the CLPS contract was cancelled by Orbit Beyond in July 2019.

The mission was targeting Mare Imbrium (29.52º N 25.68º W) just north of Annegrit crater. The landing ellipse for this mission was approximately 2 km x 1.9 km. The lander features automated hazard avoidance capabilities.

One of the science payloads is the Lunar Ultraviolet Cosmic Imager, an 80 mm aperture telescope that will scan the sky in the near UV frequencies (200–320 nm) to look for transient sources. The telescope has been completed and tested, and as of March 2019, is awaiting integration to the lander.

=== ECA rover ===
Z-01 lander would deploy a micro-rover called ECA (Ek Choti si Asha, Hindi for "A Small Hope"), also developed by Team Indus (now called Axiom Research Labs). ECA is a technology demonstrator tasked with visually exploring the vicinity of the landing site to a range of at least 500 m. The vehicle is a solar powered electric 4-wheeled rover, its mass is less than 10 kg (22 lb), and its maximum drive speed is about 6 cm/s. ECA is equipped with a pair of articulated stereo cameras and a Sun sensor. Monitoring and commanding of the rover is done exclusively through a lander relay link. The rover will operate for one lunar day, and is expected to succumb to the long frigid lunar night.

=== Z-02 ===
Z-02 is a larger lander concept that would carry up to 500 kg of commercial payloads.

== See also ==
- Google Lunar XPRIZE
- Commercial Lunar Payload Services (CLPS)
- Newspace
