= Lunar Ultraviolet Cosmic Imager =

Telescope

- Mission type: Astrophysics
- Operator: Indian Institute of Astrophysics
- Mission duration: Telescope: few months

Spacecraft properties
- Spacecraft: Z-01 lander
- Spacecraft type: Lunar lander
- Payload mass: Total: ~30 kg LUCI: 1.85 kg
- Dimensions: Telescope: 45 cm × 15 cm

Start of mission
- Launch date: TBD
- Rocket: TBD
- Launch site: TBD
- Contractor: TBD

Moon lander
- Spacecraft component: Z-01 lander
- Landing site: Mare Imbrium

Main UV telescope
- Name: LUCI
- Type: Spherical catadioptric
- Diameter: 30 cm
- Focal length: 945 mm
- Collecting area: 607 cm^{2}
- Wavelengths: near UV (200 - 320 nm)
- Resolution: ~5"

Lunar Ultraviolet Cosmic Imager (LUCI) is a small planned telescope that will be landed on the Moon to scan the sky in near UV wavelengths. It is a technology demonstrator developed by the Indian Institute of Astrophysics, and it was planned to be one of several small payloads to be deployed by the commercial Z-01 lander developed by TeamIndus in partnership with OrbitBeyond. The mission was planned to be launched in 2020 as part of NASA's Commercial Lunar Payload Services (CLPS). On 29 July 2019 OrbitBeyond announced that it would drop out of the CLPS contract with NASA, meaning that the 2020 launch was canceled and it is unknown whether the mission will ever take place.

== Science objectives ==
The science objectives of LUCI telescope are primarily to search for transient astronomical events such as supernovae, novae, tidal disruption events by massive black holes, and more exotic energetic sources such as superluminous supernovae and flashes from cosmic collisions which can be very energetic on all scales.

LUCI will also look for faint asteroids and comets in the Solar System, especially for near-Earth objects (NEO) and potentially hazardous objects. The aims are focused on UV sources not accessible by the more sensitive large space missions.

== Overview ==
The Earth's atmosphere absorbs and scatters UV photons, preventing observations of the active Universe. Placing a telescope on the surface of the Moon is advantageous because of its absence of atmosphere and ionosphere offers an unobstructed view of the space in all wavelengths. The Moon surface provides not just a stable platform, but an inexpensive and long-term access to observations in wavelengths not normally used by large orbital telescope missions. The only UV astronomical observations from the Moon to date were made by Apollo 16 team in 1972 and theLunar-based Ultraviolet telescope aboard the Chang'e 3 lunar lander in 2018. LUCI project started in 2013 and is funded by India's Department of Science and Technology. The telescope team is headed by Jayant Murthy.

The telescope has been completed as of March 2019, and was awaiting integration to the Z-01 lander. It was planned be launched in Q3 2020 on a Falcon 9 rocket and land at Mare Imbrium (29.52º N 25.68º W). On 29 July 2019 OrbitBeyond, the builder of the lander, announced that it will withdraw from the launch and the mission. Thus the mission is effectively dead. OrbitBeyond and NASA agreed that OrbitBeyond will be released from the NASA CLPS contract in general. However, OrbitBeyond remains eligible to bid for future NASA CLPS contracts.

=== Design ===
Lunar Ultraviolet Cosmic Imager
Parameter	Units/performance
Telescope type	Cassegrain
Mass	1.2 kg (2.6 lb)
Wavelength band	near UV (200 nm to 320 nm)
Primary mirror (aperture)	80 mm
Secondary mirror	32 cm
Collecting area	607 cm^{2}
Focal length	800 mm
Field of view	27:6' × 20:4'
Spatial resolution	5'
Detector	UV-enhanced CCD (Sony ICX407BLA)
Power	< 5 W
Dimensions	45 cm × 15 cm
Structure	CFRP

LUCI is a small technology demonstrator without 3-axis pointing freedom, so it will rely on the motion of the lunar sky. The optical system is a two-spherical mirror configuration and a double-pass corrector lens. Its primary lens is all-spherical measuring 80 mm transmitting light through the system to a photon-counting charge-coupled device (CCD) detector which is sensitive to ultraviolet wavelengths. The detector is an 8 mm UV-sensitive CCD with the response between 200 - 900 nm, so the engineers placed a solar blind filter before the CCD to restrict the bandpass to 200 - 320 nm.

LUCI is planned to be mostly contained within the lander, and it will be lowered back into its storage bay during the cold lunar nights. The baseline for LUCI's operation is "a few months".

== See also ==
- International Lunar Observatory, a planned lunar-based telescope
- Ultraviolet astronomy
