= David Reich =

David Reich may refer to:

- David Reich (geneticist) (born 1974), American geneticist and Harvard Medical School professor
- David L. Reich (born 1960), American hospital president, anesthesiologist, and professor
