= Rise and Decline of the Third Reich =

1974 grand strategy wargame set during World War II

- Avalon Hill 3rd Edition cover
- Designers: John Prados
- Publishers: Avalon Hill
- Years active: 1974 – current
- Genres: Grand strategy wargame, World War II
- Players: 2–6
- Setup time: 15 + minutes
- Playing time: 4–10 hours
- Chance: Medium (dice rolling)
- 1974 Charles S. Roberts Award, Best Professional Game Winner

Rise and Decline of the Third Reich or more commonly Third Reich is a grand strategy wargame covering the European theater of World War II, designed by John Prados and released in 1974 by Avalon Hill.

The game, popular because of the balance between economics, politics, and land, sea, air and strategic warfare, became Avalon Hill's bestselling game by 1980. The game was also a critical success, described as "one of the most ambitious games ever produced", "innovative and challenging", and "the finest strategic-level simulation of the war". The game was a winner at the inaugural Charles S. Roberts Awards in 1975.

== Gameplay ==
Rise and Decline of the Third Reich is a board wargame for two to six players, where each player takes on the roles of major powers during World War II: Germany, Italy, United Kingdom, France, the Soviet Union, and the United States.

Each quarterly turn (Spring, Summer, Fall, and Winter) represents three months of real time. There are several shorter scenarios covering only one year of the war, or a campaign game of 24 turns that starts with the German invasion of Poland and ends when one player is the first to fulfill victory conditions, usually by 1945 or 1946.

=== Economics ===
Each major power has a pool of Basic Resource Points (BRPs – sometimes pronounced "burps"), to represent economic power, and used to build units, declare war (35 BRPs to declare war on a major power, 10 to declare war on a minor power), or offensives (15 BRPs). The side with more BRPs moves first, so by economizing the previous season, a player may gain a "flip-flop" and make two consecutive moves, possibly allowing a devastating offensive. A Double Turn across winter 1939/40 is common: Germany moves first in Fall 1939, reduces her BRP total by building lots of units, so moves second in Winter, then first again in Spring 1940 as her BRP level refreshes, allowing a spectacular German offensive in the West. Italy's BRPs are included with Germany's even when still neutral, but US and Soviet BRPs are not included until they join the Allies, requiring careful play around the initiative change in the mid-war.

The annual Year Start Sequence ("YSS") begins with strategic warfare in an off-map box. German U-boats fight Allied Anti-submarine warfare (ASW) factors – ASW become more effective later in the war. Allied bombers, which are not as cheap or effective as U-boats, fight German interceptors, or German air factors withdrawn from the map. Excess bombers or U-boats eliminate enemy BRPs. After Strategic Warfare each power receives BRPs equal to its economic base, which may increase or decrease by a percentage of the unused BRPs at year-end (the growth rates are 60% for USA, 50% for Germany, 40% for Britain, 30% for the USSR and 20% for Italy – any extra are lost, so saving BRPs to increase the base is not sensible for Italy). Extra BRPs are received for minor countries controlled; a conquered major power (France or Italy after surrender) is treated as a minor worth half her BRP base. Germany, Britain and the USA may then spend up to 10% of their totals on strategic warfare for next year. Each major power's per-turn spending limit is half the total remaining after Strategic Warfare. Britain has a base of 125 BRPs, but as any BRP deficit from Strategic Warfare reduces the base, she often has to set aside half her BRPs to absorb U-boat losses in mid-war. Germany begins with a base of 150 BRPs, but in mid-war will often have 300 or more BRPs including conquests, and after building all her forces may have enough of a surplus to see her base increase sharply.

Countries may transfer BRPs to one another (Italy may give her spare BRPs to Germany for the high growth rate). Allied aid to the USSR, usually sorely needed, must go via Murmansk (the Germans may oppose these transfers with naval, air and U-boat battles in an off-map box), or via Persia (certain to arrive, but taking an extra turn to reach the USSR, with an initial one-off payment need to open up the pipeline).

=== Land movement and combat ===
Most counters in the game represent corps, or Soviet armies roughly the size of other countries' corps. In general two counters may stack in a hexagon, or five on a bridgehead (a bridgehead provides unlimited supply for the first post-combat supply phase, and supply may be traced to it in subsequent turns as if it were a port). Only armor units have a Zone of Control, which costs an extra two movement points to pass through (German and US armor have 6 movement points per turn, enabling them to move through two zones of control, other countries' armor units only 5; US armor units, and the two German SS Panzer corps added in 1943, also have 5 strength points rather than the usual 4). British and US infantry have 4 movement points rather than 3, reflecting their higher degree of motorization. Units remain the same throughout the game, as both sides copied one another's technological advances throughout the war.

Combat is completely voluntary. Units are always at least doubled on defense (exception: German units in the first winter after their attack on Russia). Terrain, which has no effect on movement, triples units on defense, while fortresses (Maginot Line, Westwall, Gibraltar, Malta, Leningrad and Sevastopol) quadruple them. Each combat may result in the complete elimination of either side, or an exchange, or a compulsory counterattack, either at face value (i.e. ignoring terrain effects) or at odds dictated by the table. A 2:1 attack is almost certain to succeed (albeit with some risk of an exchange), with only a 1 in 36 chance of an "attacker eliminated" – the dreaded roll of 4, followed by 6. An attack at odds of 3:1 or greater is guaranteed to succeed, the only uncertainty being whether or not the defender will be eliminated outright or inflict some exchange losses.

If the defender is eliminated, victorious attacking units may advance after combat into the hex. Provided at least one attacking unit was armor, any other armor unit which did not attack, but which was adjacent to an attacking unit, may now be placed on the newly gained hex (the "breakthrough hex"). These armored units may then "exploit", i.e. move again, provided they keep to a chain with no more than one empty hex between each unit, and then attack – a key tactic in surrounding enemy units. There is no limit to the number of armor units which may stack on or attack from the original breakthrough hex, provided the overstack is rectified by the end of the turn. Breakthrough against an empty enemy-controlled hex is not allowed, but a key position can be attacked by obtaining an overstacked armored breakthrough against a weakly held hex adjacent to it.

An alternative type of combat is "attrition". The attacker totals the land factors in contact with the enemy (air units play no part). The die roll may require the enemy to lose counters (major countries have replacement units – immobile single-factor infantry units – used to garrison remote areas or to remove to fill attrition losses, apart from the USSR which has many cheap single-factor infantry armies) or hexes – the attacker may not choose a capital, red objective city or bridgehead. The defender may eliminate units from a hex to prevent it being chosen for attrition occupation. There are three fronts (East, West and Mediterranean) on the map; in a multi-player game, attrition may only be selected if all players of one side choose that option for that front – if one player wants to take an offensive, their allies must do the same or else pass (neither movement into enemy-controlled hexes nor combat allowed).

=== Logistics ===
Each country has a prescribed "forcepool", which lists "allowable builds" as well as forces initially on the map (around a quarter of Germany's forces start the game on the map – for other countries the proportion is much higher). Units built each turn appear at once in the home country (except a rebuilt 9-factor fleet – see below). Infantry costs 1 BRP per factor, armor 2 BRPs per factor, and air, naval and paratroop units 3 BRPs per factor (e.g. 15 BRPs for a whole air unit). In Winter 1941 and the early turns of 1942 the USSR may – for a stiffening in her victory conditions – build some units for free (the "Siberian Transfer", only half of which may be armor) representing transfer of troops from the Manchurian garrison after Japan goes to war with the USA. Most countries add a few new units to their force pool in 1942. The USSR's forces are initially feeble, but she adds more powerful infantry and armor units in 1942. Germany adds some new armor and infantry units in 1943 and 1944.

After construction each country may strategically redeploy a certain number of units. SR is not permitted adjacent to enemy units, so a 3-hex corridor is needed. SR from Britain into the Mediterranean requires either two fleets (via Gibraltar – one of the fleets must be based there) or else 2 SRs and a one-turn delay (via the Cape of Good Hope). The USA also has an Initial Deployment Limit, which restricts how many units may be moved by SR each turn from the USA (shown as a box in the top-left of the map) to its main base in Europe (normally Britain). Germany's SR limit (9), although large, is not enough to cope with war on three fronts from 1944 – rebuilt Hungarian units can take a year to walk back to the Eastern Front – and can be a key factor in her collapse in the late game.

Supply may not be traced through zones of control, even if the hexes in question are occupied by friendly units. Unsupplied units cannot move, and are eliminated after the construction phase, and cannot be rebuilt in the same turn in which they are lost (unless the owning player deliberately loses them in poor-odds attacks).

=== Air warfare ===
Paratroops do not count for stacking, and negate the effect of rivers, but are lost permanently if not adjacent to a friendly unit when eliminated. They may also drop during armored exploitation. For the first half of the game the German Fallschirmjäger Corps is the only paratroop unit on the map. Britain and Italy each add a paratroop corps to their forcepools in 1942 (the USSR adds two slightly weaker ones); the USA also has a paratroop corps in her forcepool.

Up to five air factors may base at a city, or at an airbase counter (each major power has three of these, one of which may be placed each turn – once placed it can only be moved by SR or relocated to the country's capital if out of supply). Initially Germany has 6 air units and Italy 2 (i.e. 40 factors), against three British and two French (i.e. 25 factors). By the end of the war 5 German air units (i.e. 25 air factors, assuming some have been transferred to fight Allied bombers) might be facing 5 US, 4 British and 3 Soviet (i.e. 60 air factors). Air units may be voluntarily split up, and single factors may be rebuilt provided they are combined by SR to form a complete air unit.

Air units may "stage" (move between bases up to twice their combat range – during staging or SR they may fly across water up to their combat range) and still be used for combat. Air units may Counterair (attack enemy air at their bases – British air factors in Malta may decline combat but must be inverted if they do so), give Ground Support to attackers (including exploiting armor) or Defensive Air Support. For Ground Support or DAS air factors up to three times the face value of the ground forces may be added; these factors can be removed as part of an exchange, to allow the survival of ground units, or may be eliminated if that side loses the combat altogether. While the attacker may intercept DAS, a numerically superior defender cannot add extra factors to this air battle; a common house rule was to allow the defender to fly "escorts" to fight off interceptors.

In air combat from counterair or interception each side rolls a die, the larger force adding the number of factors by which their force exceeds the smaller. Italy, France and USSR add a Die Roll Modifier (DRM) of −1 and minor countries −2. The difference in the rolls is the number of factors lost by the defender – the winner loses half as many; in the event of a tie both sides lose factors equal to a third die roll. Used air units are inverted for the rest of the turn. It is sensible to keep air units out of counterair range, especially inverted units which count for zero in combat. Air superiority is vital in offensives, and the cost of rebuilding air factors is a major drain on BRPs.

=== Naval warfare ===
Each major power has generic 9-factor fleets: Britain has 10, Italy 5, Germany 4 (2 on the board at the start), France and the USSR 3 each. Four fleets (36 factors) may base at a single port. They may not be voluntarily split up and only whole fleets may be rebuilt (at a cost of 27 BRPs, and with a one-year delay).

Fleets may carry supply, may carry ground units for invasions (3 factors to carry each ground factor, i.e. a whole fleet to carry an infantry corps – a beach hex containing a port may not be invaded if a 9-factor fleet is in the hex), may give shore bombardment (3 naval factors count as one ground factor in invasions or attacks on coastal fortresses), may sea transport (carry ground units in the combat phase, 2 factors per ground factor – Germany often transports units into Latvia) or may sea escort (a whole 9-factor fleet to help a single ground unit SR over water).

Interception (determined by a die roll) is less likely to succeed over longer distances. Combat is similar to air combat (including similar national DRMs; Germany has a DRM of +2, Britain +1 and Italy −1), with losses multiplied for size in large battles. Unlike air combat no losses are taken in the event of ties, and naval units assisting ground attacks are seldom required to take losses. SR may not be intercepted so naval combat is quite rare.

=== Politics ===
Finland, Hungary, Rumania and Bulgaria (Bulgarian units may not enter the USSR) enter the game in 1941 as German minor allies, their troops controlled and paid for by Germany. Their entry may be delayed by Britain or the USSR granting them BRPs as "Foreign Aid". Other minor countries, if attacked, may become "Associated Minors" (Poland is a British Associated Minor in 1939), whose units may be rebuilt by her patron but which may not move more than one hex beyond their home country.

British and French forces may not stack together while Allied and Soviet forces may neither stack nor even attack jointly; Britain and the USA stack and cooperate freely. When France is conquered half her remaining forces form the new pro-German state of Vichy France; French North Africa (Morocco, Algeria and Tunisia) and Syria may become Vichy French or Free French. Vichy French units are removed from the game when the Allies deactivate her by die roll.

The Allies may build partisans, forcing Germany to garrison Belgrade and Athens to prevent BRP loss. Partisans may also be built in the USSR or France. A common house rule was to allow partisans in Poland to represent the Warsaw uprising.

In 1939 Germany sets up last of the major powers, and has a free offensive against Poland. The Axis player has a free choice as to when Italy enters the war, and up to 10 Italian combat factors may be "lent" to participate for free in German offensives. In the 1981 and subsequent editions Italy may surrender once the Allies have the initiative, control North Africa, Sicily (or both Sardinia and Corsica) and a foothold on the Italian mainland. Control of Italian hexes (other than ones the Allied player has taken control of) and a few units then passes to the German player. Early in the game the Soviets may seize "Eastern Europe" (Eastern Poland, Bessarabia and the Baltic states). The USSR may not declare war on Germany prior to 1942, provided Germany maintains a sufficient garrison in Finland, East Prussia and occupied Poland. The USA may declare war on Germany (sic – in reality Hitler declared war on the USA) in Spring 1942.

Each player may draw one of ten "variants". Many of these were minor amendments to the force pools, e.g. extra French armor units instead of the Maginot Line. Two of the German variants were potential game-throwers, allowing Spain (and hence seizure of Gibraltar and transfer of the Italian fleet to the Atlantic, prior to invasion of Britain) or Turkey to join the Axis. The fourth edition diluted the chances of this happening by adding an extra 10 for each side, including "Hitler Assassinated" (requiring Germany to pass for a turn, with a chunk of her BRPs frozen).

In a two-player game, Allied victory is determined by how quickly they eliminate the Axis powers, while Germany wins by conquering Britain or the USSR (both for a decisive victory - Soviet surrender depends on the size of forces in USSR, although there is a BRP penalty for loss of Moscow and/or Leningrad; if the Germans decline this one-off offer then the USSR is eliminated only on the loss of her last unit), or can win a marginal victory by controlling 28 objectives in late 1943. In a multi-player game the Western Allies (i.e the USA and Britain jointly) and Soviets separately tally the number of objective cities they control; the French (France is controlled by the Soviet player if there is no separate French player) or Italian players "win" by surviving longer than their real-life counterparts.

=== Tactics ===
Third Reich was a favorite at conventions, and was the subject of extensive literature, particularly in Avalon Hill's magazine, The General. Much of this covered opening setups, intricate tactics (eg. manipulating the BRP level to obtain a double-turn or exploiting rules around supply, armor exploitation and paratroop drops) and plans of campaign (eg. early German attacks on France ("the crapshoot") or the USSR, the "Spanish Gambit" (a German invasion of Spain to seize Gibraltar, making East European minor countries less likely to join the Germans but possibly allowing the Italian navy to help invade Britain), and the "shotgun" (a vicious German offensive against the USSR over a double turn).

== Publication history ==
Rise and Decline of the Third Reich was designed by John Prados and published by Avalon Hill in 1974. The company's published history admitted that the game suffered from "a hurriedly prepared rulebook with more than its share of ambiguities" but pointed out that "this game was terrifically successful as evidenced by an assortment of consumer awards ... [it was] One of the company's all-time best sellers."

A second edition in 1976 cleaned up inaccuracies and ambiguities in the units. A third edition in 1981 dealt with map issues, and a 4th edition in 1984 revised the rules.

In 1986 Avalon Hill published a Gamers Guide to Third Reich. This featured Designers Notes, stressing the game's focus on economics, air and armor (in that order), and mentioning that Prados' original draft had been at division-level with a much larger number of air points, making it an exercise in "finger dexterity". There were also several strategy articles, many of them written by Marcus Watney and many of which had previously appeared in The General, outlining plans for German attacks on France & Yugoslavia, an Italian attack on Yugoslavia, and British, French and Soviet defenses against German attack. There was also a discussion of the game's portrayal of economics, and a draft diplomacy system in which major powers bid "Diplomacy Points" for control of minor countries, a later version of which would be included in Advanced Third Reich. The guide criticized the unrealistic weakness of the late war Soviets in BRPs, air and armor units.

Many articles about the game were published in Avalon Hill's house magazine The General. These included draft rules for British surrender, with some free British forces potentially fighting on from Canada; and giving the Soviets a few extra air and armor units later in the game.

Many of these draft rules were incorporated by Bruce Harper into Advanced Third Reich, published in 1992. This was followed by a Pacific Theater counterpart, Empire of the Rising Sun, in 1995. In 2003, both of these games were combined and revised by GMT Games and released as A World at War.

In 2001, Avalanche Press released a separate new version designed by Brian L. Knipple. Because it more closely resembled the original game, it became known as John Prados' Third Reich.

=== Computer game ===
Avalon Hill's Computer Third Reich was a computer version of the wargame. Computer Gaming World, in 1992, stated that the AI opponent offered a "sufficient challenge for beginners"; good at finding weak points in opponents but not always good at choosing the right ways to exploit them. The magazine recommended the computer version to those who wanted to learn the game but could not find local opponents, but suggested that experienced players only buy it to play by mail.

== Reception ==
In the April 1975 issue of Airfix Magazine, Bruce Quarrie called Third Reich "One of the most interesting, though complicated, games to come our way for some time." Quarrie noted that one of the positive aspects of its complexity was that "There is literally no end to the permutations which can be employed in this game, which demands a basic knowledge of strategy and economic principles as well as basic military tactics." He concluded, "It is one of the most ambitious games ever produced and certainly not one for the novice to attempt, but for the experienced wargamer it presents an absorbing challenge."

In a 1976 poll conducted by Simulations Publications Inc. to determine the most popular wargames in North America, Third Reich placed a highly respectable 33rd out of 202 games. In a similar poll conducted by Avalon Hill but only for their own products, Third Reich placed 6th out of 25 Avalon Hill games.

In his 1977 book The Comprehensive Guide to Board Wargaming, Nicholas Palmer noted that "Third Reich's strongest point is the military production system, which works smoothly (if with questionable historical accuracy in certain cases) and ties the game together." He thought the game was "excellent both for two players or more, though the rules tie the players closely to history and limit diplomatic opportunities." He concluded with a warning that the game was "extremely complex, with rules disputes not uncommon; every participant should be good to make the game really come to life."

Palmer also devoted a significant amount of his 1980 sequel, The Best of Board Wargaming to analysis of the game, which he listed as the epitome of the very complex but ordinary-sized game (as opposed to "large, relatively simple" and games which are both large and complex). He noted that ahistorical strategies such as an early German attack on the USSR, or Allied invasions of Italy, could be explored in a matter of days of real time, rather than months. Palmer described as "pretty peculiar" the cost of declaring war on major powers and the mechanism by which players can obtain a double turn by manipulating the Basic Resource Point Level. Palmer also had issues with confusion caused by the level of command being simulated: the players are presumably representing the governments of each country, but are also expected to take operational decisions. Nonetheless Palmer found it to be "a surprisingly satisfactory game" and "a fascinating game of strategy which retains a broad resemblance to World War Two in Europe [that has] great subtlety in strategy and tactics ... [It is] far from fully analysed despite a number of specialist players having concentrated on it for years." Palmer concluded that it was "fascinating and intricate".

In The Guide to Simulations/Games for Education and Training, Martin Campion disagreed with the assessment of both Nicky Palmer and Avalon Hill that France is doomed, writing that although it was "an innovative and challenging game which allows a player to experience the complexity of events in a total war," that "The game breaks down in many details however. It is impossible for the Germans to make quick work of Poland and France, for example, and this throws the whole beginning of the war off the historical track."

In Issue 50 of Moves, Steve List noted "This game is notorious for the poor organization of its rules and the copious errata published for it." List concluded, "For those with encyclopedic minds, the rules can be learned, and the game is enjoyable to play."

In the 1980 book The Complete Book of Wargames, game designer Jon Freeman called the game system "a refreshing change from the sometimes hackneyed design features of many modern wargames. Players are given a wealth of strategic options; yet the events of the war are re-created by making the historical objectives desirable in game terms." Freeman concluded, "All the major elements of the war are here, but the wealth of detail never overwhelms the game (as it does in the typical "monster" game.) It is easily the finest strategic-level simulation of the war."

In Issue 13 of the Australian wargaming magazine Queensland Wargamer, Noel Bugeia reviewed the third edition and noted that the main differences were "most of the old optional rules are now compulsory, and small anomalies have been tied up." Bugeia liked that "There are many levels on which the game can be played: short scenario, long scenario, campaign game, 2 or more players."

In the November 1981 edition of Dragon (Issue #55), Tony Watson reviewed the updated third edition game components that had just been released, specifically a new map, new rules and new force-pool cards. He found changes to the map to be minor, but changes to the rules to have a major impact on the game, especially in air and naval combat and strategic warfare. Watson recommended that Third Reich players get the new components, saying, "Though some of the new rules take a little getting used to..., once they are understood they prove out to be changes for the better. It would seem that it is possible to improve upon a good thing, and the folks at Avalon Hill should be commended for caring enough to take another look at one of their products."

In Issue 34 of Phoenix, Marcus Watney also reviewed the updated third edition game components and found several problems with the new rules, including air combat and certain armor movement rules. On the other hand, Watney found certain changes to be very positive, including the revised naval rules, ground combat and strategic rules. He concluded, "The new game is a definite and very major improvement."

In Issue 36 of Warning Order, Matt Irsik compared the original first edition by Avalon Hill to the 2001 edition published by Avalanche Press, and found the map and double-sided counters of the newer game more colorful and useful. Irsik preferred the "chit pull" system of the newer game "that makes turns very interesting", and noted that in the newer edition "you can purchase chits that allow your forces to do a variety of operations on multiple fronts. That's the first major difference in these two versions." Irsik also preferred the emphasis on diplomacy in the newer game. He thought that the random events that occur in the newer game add to its replayability, since no two games will be exactly alike. But Irsik was unsure whether he preferred the newer game's dice rolling method of combat resolution to the original edition's Combat Resolution Chart, saying "This can create some wild swings of fortune and some players do not care for this system. However, the [Avalon Hill] system is almost exactly the opposite where you pretty much know beforehand what the results are going to be for each combat." He concluded that both games will attract their fans, but he preferred the newer game, saying, "the [Avalon Hill] version is still a good game. In terms of graphics, game design, game systems, etc., it is showing its age, but that should not deter gamers from giving it a try and in fact there is still a sizeable crowd that will only play the AH game. The [Avalanche Press] version, however, is a vast improvement in my opinion on an already proven design."

== Other reviews and commentary ==
- Panzerfaust #66

== Awards ==
At the inaugural Charles S. Roberts Awards presented at Origins 1975, Rise and Decline of the Third Reich won in the category "Best Professional Game of 1974".

== In popular culture ==
Roberto Bolaño's novel The Third Reich features a wargame champion who specializes in playing Rise and Decline of the Third Reich.

== Video game adaptations ==
- Computer Third Reich (1992)
- Third Reich (1996)
