= Reicher =

Reicher may refer to:

== People ==
- Emanuel Reicher (1849–1924), German actor
- Emanoil-George Reicher (1930–2019), Romanian chess player
- Frank Reicher (1875–1965), German actor, director and producer
- Hedwiga Reicher (1884–1971), German actress
- Louis Joseph Reicher (1890–1984), bishop of the Roman Catholic Diocese of Austin
- Steve Reicher, professor of social Psychology and head of the School of Psychology at the University of St Andrews

== Education ==
- Reicher Catholic High School, Waco, Texas

== Religion ==
- Reicher Synagogue, Łódź, Poland
