= 4th Reich (game) =

Science fiction wargame

- Designers: Howard Anderson; Dana Lombardy
- Illustrators: Dana Lombardy; Bruce Weigle
- Publishers: Task Force Games
- Publication: 1985
- Genres: Science fiction

4th Reich, subtitled "Puremen vs. the Mutants for Control of the World", is a pulp science fiction wargame published by Task Force Games in 1985 that simulates a future war between humans and mutants. Loosely based on the anti-Nazi novel The Iron Dream by Norman Spinrad, this game divided critics, one calling it "entertainingly bizarre" while another characterized it as "tasteless".

== Background ==
In 1972, The Iron Dream by Jewish writer Norman Spinrad was published. This satirical novel supposes an alternate reality where Adolph Hitler emigrated to the United States after World War I and became a pulp fiction writer, penning the novel Lord of the Swastika where Truemen of uncorrupted DNA battle mutants.

== Description ==
4th Reich is a two-player board wargame where one player controls Truemen and the other controls mutants. The home country of the Truemen, Geld, is threatened by Mutant invasion.

=== Components ===
The game box contains an 18" x 24" hex grid map of Europe, 108 counters, and an 8-page rulebook.

=== Victory conditions ===
The Pureman player has 25 turns to capture all 29 cities and eliminate all Mutant units to win. Failure means a Mutant victory. Rules are also included for solitaire play.

== Publication history ==
4th Reich was designed by Dana Lombardy and Howard Anderson, and was published by Task Force Games in 1985 with artwork by Lombardy and Bruce Weigle.

== Reception ==
In Issue 21 of the Australian gaming magazine Breakout!, Paul Garnham thought this was "Fascist fantasy set in the far future where a genetically pure man, Max Hetler (sic) leads a crusade against the mutants." Garnham called it "Panzergruppe Guderian in drag."

Different Worlds chose to ignore the satirical element as well as the politics, calling it "the struggle for control of the world in the far-fetched future ... The outcome — victory or death — will determine if our future world is mutant or human."

In Issue 27 of Simulacrum, Brian Train called this "A very tasteless game, in terms of its subject material." Referring to the unbalanced combat between the superhuman Truemen and their mutant opponents "who shamble around under the fragmented leadership of Controllers to try and overrun the homeland of Geld", Train thought this was "Not a very stimulating game either."

In Analog Science Fiction, Matthew Costello called this " an entertainingly bizarre game for Task Force Games."
