= Empire of the Rising Sun =

Board wargame

Empire of The Rising Sun (RSN–1995) is a board wargame published originally by Avalon Hill, designed by Bruce Harper with much input by Dave Casper into the naval warfare rules. This is the Pacific War companion game to Advanced Third Reich (A3R), using similar rules, and containing once again a copy of Ultra magazine with a synopsis of the game. A previous version, occasionally discussed in the pages of The General magazine, had been in development the late 1970s, but was never published.

== Pacific Map ==
The map (designed by Charlie Kibler) is made up of two 31" × 22" sheets with 1" hexes and depicts the whole of the Pacific Ocean including parts of Australia, India, China, Russia and Japan. As in Europe the United States is represented by an off-map U.S. Box, although the Aleutian Islands (Alaska) and the Hawaiian Islands are shown on the map. The map is on a larger scale than the European war, so air units have range of 3 not 4, armour Zones of Control cost only one extra movement point (not 2) to move through and do not extend into rough terrain, while exploiting armour must keep to a chain of adjacent hexes, rather than one hex apart. The capture of hexes through attrition is much less likely.

Eastern India and the northern parts of Australia (including Darwin and Cairns) are shown on the map. A (black-and-white) extension map for the whole of Australia was published in Ultra magazine in the late 1990s. The game includes rules for a successful Japanese player to force the surrender of India or Australia by transferring units into the relevant off-map box and conducting attrition combat. Strategic Redeployment of forces from one theatre to another (it takes a turn to move from one off-map box—the European US box, the Pacific US box, South Africa, Western India, Southern Australia, SouthWest Pacific—to another) can take several seasons.

Much of the eastern map is taken up by ocean, dotted with island groups—a player need not occupy every single island to control the group, provided no enemy units are present. Units can stay unsupplied in a port or on a 1-hex island without being eliminated.

The summer turn is the monsoon, in which attack or movement into rough terrain is forbidden. In normal weather Allied units (apart from Chindits or stealthy Australians) must stop in rough or jungle terrain, but Japanese can move freely through. However, after the Japanese seizure of Malaya and Burma in Winter 1941, land movement will probably play little role in the game, until the Soviet invasion of Manchuria in the final turns; the land war in China is usually an ongoing attrition and stalemate.

== Naval Warfare ==
=== Aircraft Carriers and Naval Aviators ===
The naval war will take up most of players' time during the game, the explicit idea being that a major Pacific naval battle will take as long to resolve as an armour offensive on the Eastern Front. Players still have generic naval factors as in the European game, but also have separate named aircraft carriers, normally of two (CVL) or three (CV) factors. The former are much easier to sink, and take a year to rebuild (CVs take two years). The US also has some optional four factor carriers (CVB) which did not see service in the actual war. Each carrier factor can base a single Naval Air Squadron (NAS)—one-third of the size of an Army Air Factor, but equal for combat strength if fighting "over water" (although, because of the size differential, three losses would need to be inflicted to destroy a single AAF). Naval Air Squadrons may also base at cities, and one squadron and/or 9 naval factors may base on a one-hex island.

Japanese naval air squadrons start the game as "elite", using distinctive black-on-yellow counters and with a +1 Die Roll Modifier for combat. When eliminated, these are replaced with normal air squadrons, but the intense training required by naval aviators means Japan is limited to rebuilding 3 squadrons per turn. Whereas the American Air Training limit increases over time, a major battle (like Midway in reality) can cost Japan more naval air squadrons than she can replace in a year, and by 1944 Japan may well find herself with empty aircraft carriers as was the case at the Battle of Leyte Gulf. When the Americans draw close enough to the Home Islands, Japan may resort to building nine kamikaze air squadrons per turn. Kamikazes, for which the elite black-on-yellow counters are once again used, perform poorly in combat (-2 Die Roll Modifier) but their suicide attacks hit Allied ships at double strength.

=== Taskforces and Patrols ===
Naval forces may now be sent out as taskforces, which may not be examined by the other side. A taskforce may "Patrol" by "changing base" to a sea hex, where it remains throughout the enemy player turn. A patrol may attack any enemy land-based air in range (rolling for surprise as appropriate), after which enemy naval interception of the patrol, if attempted, is automatic. The following player turn the patrol (or a successful intercepting force, which may itself remain on patrol in the sea hex) may intercept enemy naval moves or give ground support to an attack (carriers may never give Defensive Air Support to ground units). A patrol might, therefore, lurk near to the target hex of a seaborne invasion, ready to take out enemy land-based air and head off enemy naval forces. Like any naval force, a patrol may not be intercepted on its way home after its mission is completed.

=== Naval Combat ===
For naval combat a player may split his taskforce into "combat groups" of at least nine factors each.

Before each combat round each player allocates his naval air squadrons to attack enemy land bases in range or the enemy fleet, while up to half his naval air squadrons may be CAP (combat air patrol—flying in defence of their own combat group). Each player then makes a search roll to see how many enemy combat groups are located (if not located they cannot be attacked that round). The search roll is affected by radar, and will be higher, the more friendly combat groups a player has and the more nearby airbases containing at least one friendly squadron (the number of squadrons in each base is irrelevant, so it is better to build a network of small forces), and the more enemy combat groups which are escorting a supply line, or carrying invasion troops (it therefore makes sense to group these "slow" elements in a single combat group—players also sometimes place a single 9-factor fleet as a decoy in the first combat group to make the fast carriers harder to locate and attack). Although some element of the fog of war is (obviously) lost naval battles are perfectly playable solitaire by making rational deployment choices for each side.

Before located combat groups are attacked, that group's CAP (which have a +1 DRM) may engage as many attackers as they like (so 2 squadrons of CAP might pick off a single attacking squadron to improve their chances). AAF based nearby may also give air cover. As in the European game the combat group then makes a defence roll (surviving CAP added to the defence strength), after which any surviving non-aborted attacking air may now attack the enemy combat group.

Naval Air Squadrons—but not army air factors—may target individual fast carriers, which may themselves make a separate defence roll prior to being attacked. It will be recalled that a fast carrier has 2 or 3 factors—if each factor is "destroyed" or damaged twice by the attack, the ship as a whole is deemed "sunk", while if each factor is either "destroyed" or damaged once, the ship as a whole is deemed to be "damaged" and must leave the combat (attacking NAS must return to the aircraft carrier from which they took off, or be lost if she has been sunk, although those flying CAP may land at any carrier or friendly land base (at the cost of inverting)). Any other result (i.e. at least one carrier factor remaining in pristine condition) is deemed to be repaired at sea and the carrier begins the next round of combat with all factors once again intact.

The difference between the two players' search rolls is the "surprise" result enjoyed by the player with the higher search result for that round of combat. High levels of surprise can be catastrophic, with CAP or defence rolls delayed until after the air attack or disallowed altogether, or all damage being lethal—this is what makes a disaster like the Battle of Midway possible. A second round of air attacks may now ensue, starting with a fresh search roll.

After two rounds of air attack, naval surface combat may commence, with each side adding in a new combat group with each round (once engaged in surface combat, a combat group need no longer be "searched" for!). Surface combat is actually and perhaps unrealistically rare, and not the way to sink fast carriers as they are deemed to be "screened" by any ordinary naval factors in their combat group.

There are some hard-to-remember rule anomalies—army air factors (if they survive counterair) are added to the defence strength of a naval base, but this is not true if they are giving air cover to a naval force—the opposite is true of naval air squadrons flying CAP. Some of these intricate rules were streamlined somewhat in A World At War.

=== Escort Carriers and Other Units ===
US Escort carriers (CVE)—generic factors, which do not carry separate naval air squadrons—also appear in the game. They are too slow to take part in naval interceptions, but can be used to provide ground support for attacks (carrier-based air may not intercept enemy Defensive Air Support), or take part in anti-submarine warfare.

Japan may build Island Fortresses (1 per turn), which receive an extra +1 DM if subjected to invasion. The US player receives six single-factor US Marine Divisions, added gradually to the US forcepool throughout the game, which give a countervailing DM benefit in seaborne invasions, but which must be used to take any losses resulting from such combat. The US player also receives Artificial Harbours to increase his naval basing capacity in 1944 and 1945.

== Strategic Warfare ==
Strategic Warfare may feature destruction of BRPs by submarines of both sides. Japanese submarines—which have an initial advantage from their "Long Lance" torpedoes—determine their effectiveness by tracing distance to the eastern map edge from the most easterly Japanese naval base. American submarines grow in power throughout the game, their effectiveness being determined by tracing distance to Japan's oil supply route (from the Dutch East Indies to Japan) from the nearest US naval base. BRP losses from US submarines will be massive by 1944 but are limited to 1/4 of the value of Japan's overseas conquests each turn, but once they pass 15 BRPs per turn Japan begins to suffer from incremental "oil effects", gradually degrading her economy, submarines and surface fleet. Japan is deemed to be subject to "oil effects" in Winter 1941 from the US embargo, but these will probably be lifted once Japan achieves control of the Dutch East Indies (modern Indonesia).

Submarines may also operate on the map, and may attack damaged surface ships as they leave combat. Each side may also send surface factors to sea as raiders. The USA may also raid the Japanese oil route, which may also be bombed by Army Air Factors.

The USA may also build strategic bombers. These are more effective than in Europe, as Japanese cities were built from wood, but will not be usable until the final turns of the game—although permissible bombing range increases throughout the game, in practice the USA needs to occupy the Marianas and then Okinawa, or bomb Japan from China if a sea supply route can be traced. In the final turns US strategic bombers may drop two Atomic Bombs, which besides exterminating any Japanese units in the target hex also increase the chances of Japanese surrender (see below).

Each turn the US player receives between 0 and 4 "Magic" points, representing breaking of Japanese codes, and which may be used to affect naval and submarine effectiveness, or which can be used to Strategically Redeploy a 9-factor fleet.

== Game Play ==
=== Combatants ===
The game is essentially for two players—the USA and Japan. Britain (including Australia and India, now treated as British Minor Allies, although Australian units can be lent to the USA) has some forces in the Far East, including a few CVLs normally based in India or Ceylon (other CVLs which were based in Europe are also included, for use if the game is combined with Advanced Third Reich). The Dutch, Filipinos and Thais (Japanese Associated Minor) have tiny forces. Counters are also included for pro-Japanese Indian and Chinese separatists, who may enter through play of variants. China and the USSR also play a role, but there is no diplomacy per se during the Pacific War.

Nationalist China (white counters), the weakest of the great powers, has a theoretical base of 40 BRPs—20 in practice (allowing a minuscule 10 BRP per turn spending limit) as four out of her five Key Economic Areas (Shanghai, Peking, Canton, Nanking, but not Chiang Kai-Shek's capital at Chungking) are already occupied by Japan prior to the start of the US-Japanese War. This makes China dependent on US BRP grants to rebuild her forces, which given the Japanese occupation of the land supply route through Vietnam and Burma, means that small numbers of BRPs must be flown "over the Hump" (over the Himalayas from Ledo to Kunming—the Allied player normally needs to base some US air factors in India to achieve this—two air factors are needed to carry each BRP). Claire Chennault's Flying Tigers (orange counters) give China her own tiny (two factor) air force.

Communist China (red counters), a minor power, has small forces present. A Chinese Resistance Table reduces the freedom of action of Chinese forces and the degree of cooperation between the two Chinese factions if China is in serious trouble.

=== Course of the Game ===
The game starts with a Japanese double-turn across Winter 1941 and Spring 1942. Japan may use this to attack Pearl Harbor, with the location of the six US fast carriers (in Pearl Harbor, out on patrol, or in the US Box) decided by die roll; Japan may also make a second air strike but without the devastating surprise of the first. Japan may also seize Hong Kong, Malaya, Singapore (whose fortifications do not protect against landward attack from Malaya), Burma, the Dutch East Indies and the Philippines. During the opening turn Japanese land units may invade undefended beaches and walk inland on the same turn, while Allied ground units are subject to a -1 DM (except the US Marines on Wake Island) and Allied air units are inverted.

During 1942 the forces will be roughly equal, with six or so aircraft carriers on each side—this was the period which in reality saw tense fighting for Midway, the Coral Sea and Guadalcanal. As in Advanced Third Reich the US economic base (counted separately from the "European War" US economy) starts at 150 BRPs, but grows automatically by 20 BRP per turn after entering the war, so by 1944-5 the US economy will have grown to colossal size. American SR and initial deployment capacity are linked to the size of her base, while her forcepool increases in tranches, so by 1944-5 the USA will have achieved overwhelming strength in submarines, surface fleet and air factors. After the end of the war in Europe, the Soviets may invade Manchuria, which Japan has been required to garrison up until this point.

Japanese surrender is governed by a table, similar to the British and Soviet surrender tables in Advanced Third Reich, in which Japan is assessed each turn for loss of oil, destruction of her armed forces (a rules anomaly allows the Japanese air force to escape destruction by sheltering in the Strategic Warfare Box), loss of objectives and atomic attacks. Japan is unlikely to "win" in real terms so game victory is determined by how quickly the Allies achieve Japanese surrender (whether or not requiring atomic attacks or invasion of the home islands) compared to the actual historical timeline.

=== Scenarios ===
Besides the introductory scenarios (for Pearl Harbor, and the battles of the Coral Sea, Midway, Leyte Gulf) the game also includes full-map scenarios starting in 1942 and 1944.

The game also provides experimental rules for combining with Advanced Third Reich to simulate the whole global conflict. If there is no separate Chinese player Nationalist China, at war with Japan from the start, would be controlled by the US player, and Communist China by the Soviet player. The Designer's Notes state that ERS, shorter and less strategically complex than A3R, fits into the global war in the same proportion that the Eastern Front fits into the European War.

A US-Japanese tensions table, similar to the US-Axis Tensions table, governs relations between those two powers until they go to war with one another. Japan may seize various territories (e.g. French Indo-China—modern Vietnam—after the Fall of France in 1940, leaving Burma as the only Allied land supply route for BRPs to China), while the USA may deploy her fleet—possibly placed on alert—to Pearl Harbor and subject Japan to an oil embargo prior to the outbreak of hostilities.

Another feature of these rules is the replacement of variants (of which a basic Pacific set is included for old-fashioned players) with rudimentary rules allowing players to "research" changes in, say, bomber, jet fighter, rocket, submarine or torpedo technology, and thus shape the development of her armed forces over the course of the game. These rules were greatly expanded in A World at War.

== Reception ==
In Issue 6 of Zone of Control, James C. Gordon called this "more than a watery Advanced Third Reich. No, this game is a much more monumental achievement, rising above the shadow cast by its illustrious progenitor to give a brilliant illumination of the Pacific fighting."

== Awards ==
Empire of the Rising Sun won the Origins Award for "Best Modern-Day Board Game of 1995".
