= MoonArk =

MoonArk is a Moon museum made by Carnegie Mellon University which was launched onboard the Astrobotic Technologies Peregrine lunar lander. It is mounted to the main deck of the lander.

== Development ==
MoonArk contains four Chambers:

- Ether
- Moon
- Metasphere
- Earth

MoonArk was made in 2008. There are actually twin Moon Arks – one that will go to the Moon and another that will be shown in traveling displays around the world. The final assembly of the MoonArk sent to the Moon occurred on 2 June 2021.

== Contents ==
The MoonArk contains:

- The DNA of a goat
- A vial containing the blood of 33 artists
- Hundreds of images
- Pieces of music
- Poems
- River water
- Ocean water
- Gemstones
- Miniature murals, such as Moonscape, a metal mural by artist Dylan Vitone, which measures roughly 1.5 inches by 4.5 inches.
- Arctic tern DNA
- Coal
- Rock
- Hopi corn
- A fragrance sample
- A collection of tiny drawings
- Maps
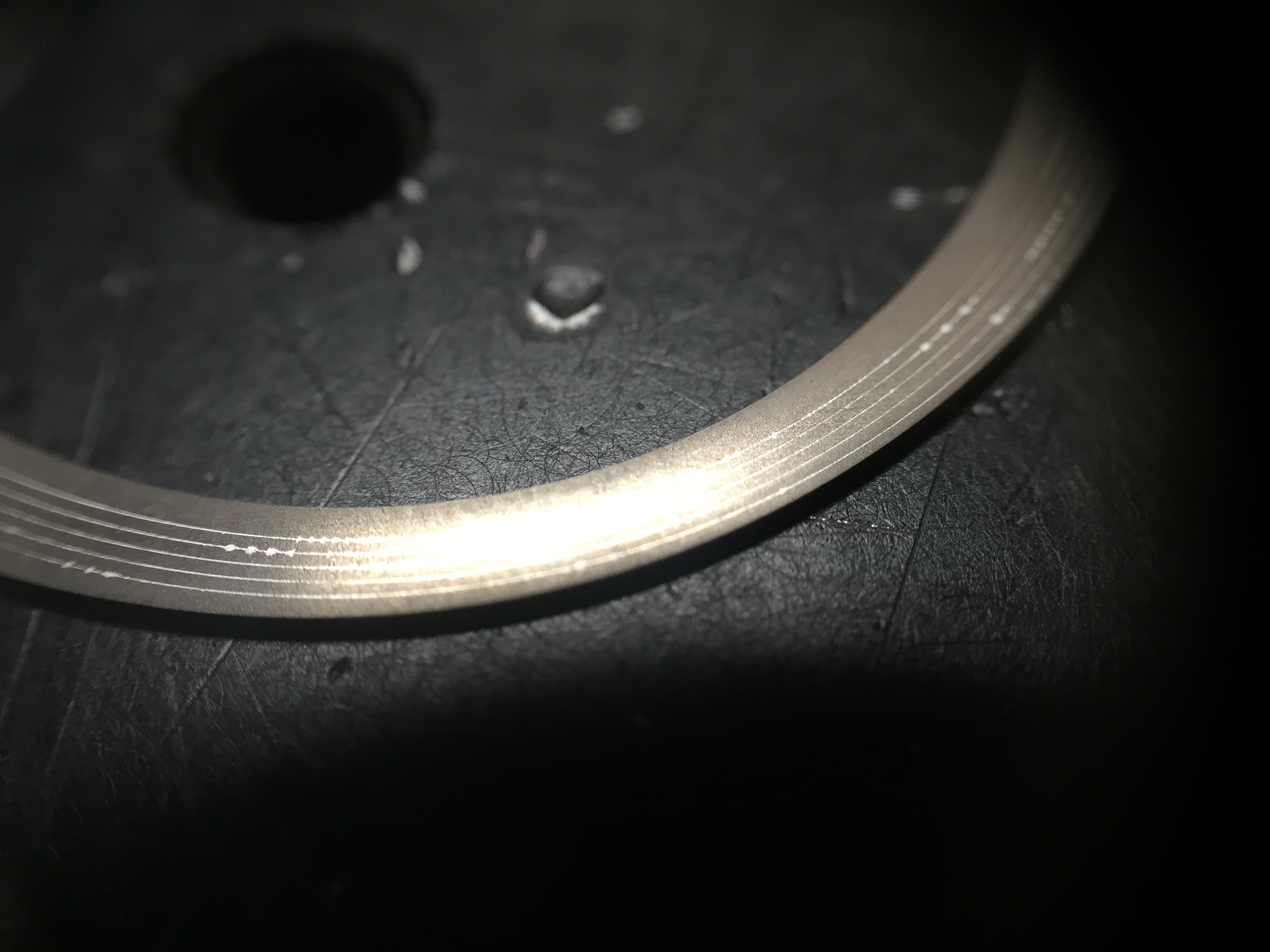
  Musical Score on ring frame

It is 3D printed using a 3D Systems ProX200 3D printer supplied by 3rd Dimension Industrial 3D Printing. Laser engraved murals of UNESCO World Heritage Sites and musical scores visualized through microscopic marking were made by Joshua Christley at MECCO Partners, LLC. It is constructed at James Madison University.

== Exhibitions ==
While awaiting launch, both MoonArks traveled around the world going to exhibitions. Some of them include:

- A MESSAGE TO SPACE at SUPERCOLLIDER GALLERY
- Vasarely Museum
- Carnegie Museum of Natural History
- Centre Pompidou
- New Worlds Conference
- Municipal Art Gallery of Bydgoszcz
- Thrival Festival
