= Third Reich (video game) =

- Publisher: Avalon Hill
- Platform: Windows
- Release: 1996
- Genre: Strategy

Third Reich is a 1996 video game from Avalon Hill. It is based on the board game Rise and Decline of the Third Reich.

== Gameplay ==
Third Reich is a strategy game which emphasizes complex tactical decision-making. Players are tasked with managing resources and planning military operations.

== Reception ==
Reception

Review scores
Publication	Score
Computer Gaming World	2.5/5
Computer Games Magazine	2/5
GameSpot	2.6/10

Computer Gaming World said "If you want to see how a classic boardgame should be converted to the computer, look no farther than AH's Wooden Ships and Iron Men, and pass this unhappy conflict by". Games Domain said "Third Reich, by its empirical nature, requires a precision which is absent in more "user-friendly" offerings, but that makes every successful move that much more rewarding".

The Age called it a must have for any who enjoyed the board game.
