= Ceres Robotics =

American Aerospace Company

Ceres Robotics Inc.
- Company type: Private, Commercial
- Industry: Aerospace, Robotics
- Founded: 2017
- Founder: Michael Sims
- Fate: Active
- Headquarters: Palo Alto, California, US
- Key people: Michael Sims (CEO); Michael D'Angelo (President); Pascal Lee (Chief Scientist)
- Products: Rovers, Landers
- Website: www.ceresrobotics.com

Ceres Robotics Inc. is a private, commercial company dedicated to the development and manufacturing of robotic lunar landers and rovers.

In November 2019, Ceres Robotics was granted the right to bid on contracts by NASA's Commercial Lunar Payload Services (CLPS) to support the lunar Artemis program.

The company was founded in 2017 by Michael Sims, who was previously vice president at Moon Express, and for more than 20 years worked at NASA, where he worked on Mars rover missions. Sims was also a founding member of the NASA Ames Artificial Intelligence group and its field robotics program, the Intelligent Robotics Group.

== Products ==
Ceres Robotics is a New Space company dedicated to the development and manufacturing of robotic lunar landers, rovers and software systems in support of surface exploration.

Current products

- CR3 Rover
- B5 Lander
