= Quad (rocket) =

VTVL technology demonstrator

- Function: VTVL
- Manufacturer: Armadillo Aerospace

Size
- Height: ~1.9 m (~75 inches)
- Width: ~1.9 m (~75 inches)
- Mass: ~1500 lbs (~680 kg)

Capacity

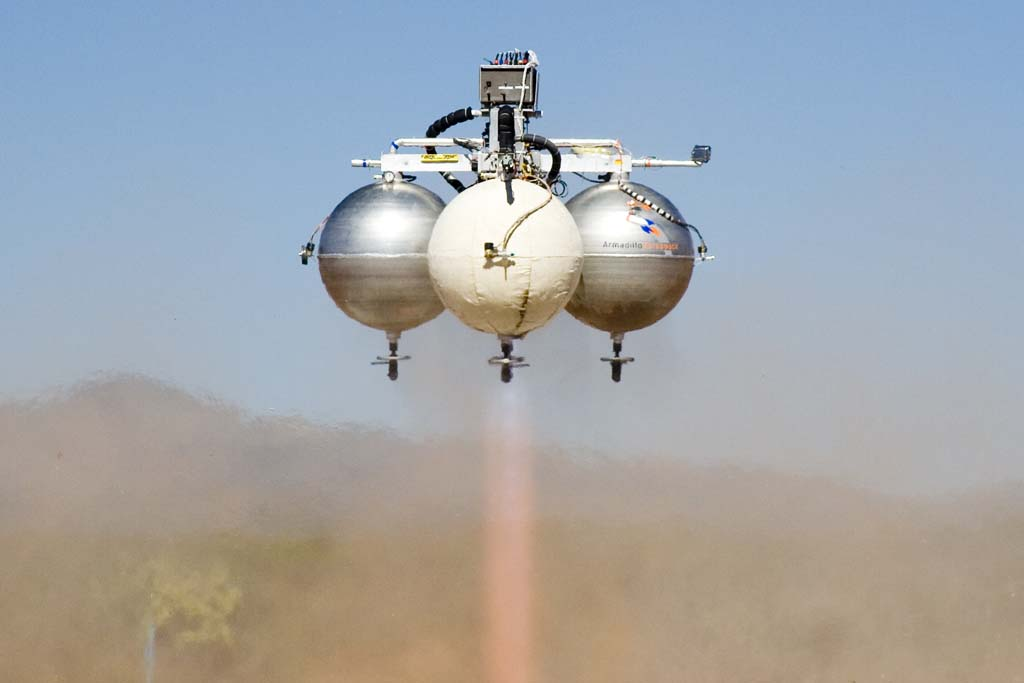
Pixel attempting level 1-white tanks are insulated and contain liquid oxygen, grey tanks contain ethanol.

In rocketry, the Armadillo Aerospace Quad vehicle called Pixel is a computer-controlled VTVL rocket that was used in 2006 to compete in the Lunar Lander Challenge.

== General description ==
The quad vehicle design is a pressure fed in blow-down mode from an initial pressure of 320 psi for level 1 (400 psi level 2). The cold gas vernier engines are cross-fed by gas drawn from ullage space of the opposite tank. The vehicle was able to transfer propellant through connecting pipes between opposite tanks by controlling ullage pressures with the thrusters; this helps it balance, minimizing gas use. The main engine had two-axis thrust vectoring. The vehicle was fully computer controlled; with guidance from GPS and fiber optic gyros.

== Specification ==
The specification for Pixel/Texel for level 1:

- Width: ~1.9 m (~75 inches)
- Height: ~1.9 m (~75 inches)
- Dry Weight: 650 pounds
- Gross Lift Off Weight (GLOW): ~1500 pounds (360 pounds ethanol, ~500 LOX)
- Payload: 55 pounds
- Engines: 1 (+ 4 cold gas attitude jets)
- Thrust (sl): ~3000 pounds

Engine (XPC-06):

- Thrust: ~3000 pounds (throttleable to 25%)
- Chamber Pressure: 300 psi
- Nozzle Area Ratio: 2:1
- Isp (sl): ~140-~200 seconds (low-high throttle)
- Length: 0.51 m (20 inches)
- Diameter: 0.2 m (8 inches)
- Chamber: carbon fiber reinforced graphite built by Cesaroni aerospace
- Burn Time: >100 seconds, expected >180 for level 2, with approximately double the propellant mass.

== Purchase by NASA ==
On 8 March 2010, Matthew Ross of Armadillo Aerospace confirmed that Pixel had been converted to methane/LOX propellant and sold to NASA as part of the Project M testbed for the Autonomous Landing Hazard Avoidance Technology (ALHAT) LIDAR range finding system under development by Jet Propulsion Laboratory (JPL).

== See also ==
- Reusable Vehicle Testing program of the Japanese Space Agency JAXA
- Project Morpheus NASA program to continue developing ALHAT and Quad landers
- Blue Origin New Shepard
- Kankoh-maru
- McDonnell Douglas DC-X
- Zarya
- CORONA
- Grasshopper
