= Lunar Lander Challenge =

Competition funded by NASA's Centennial Challenges program

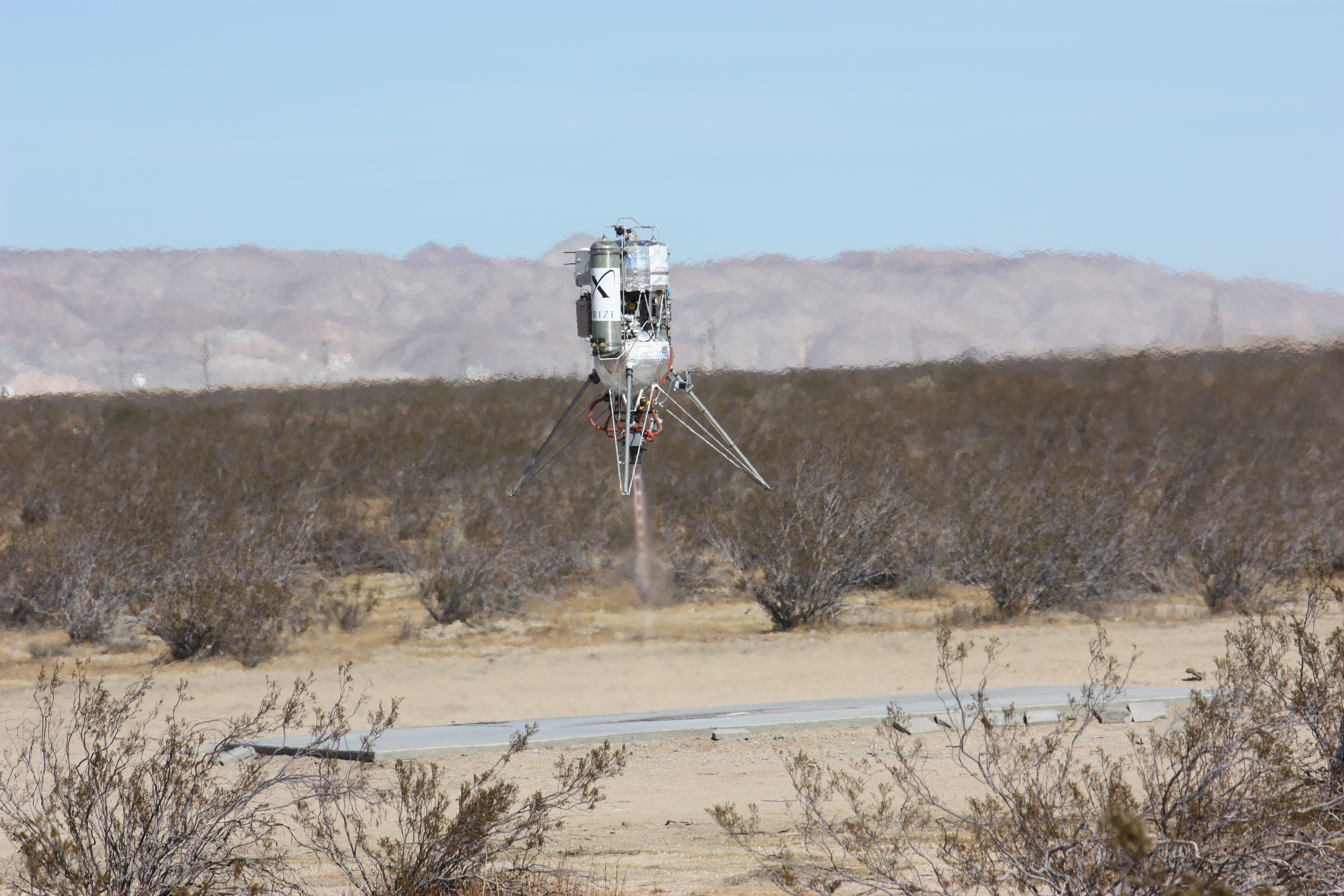
Masten Space Systems' "Xoie" on the Level 2 competition-winning landing on October 30, 2009

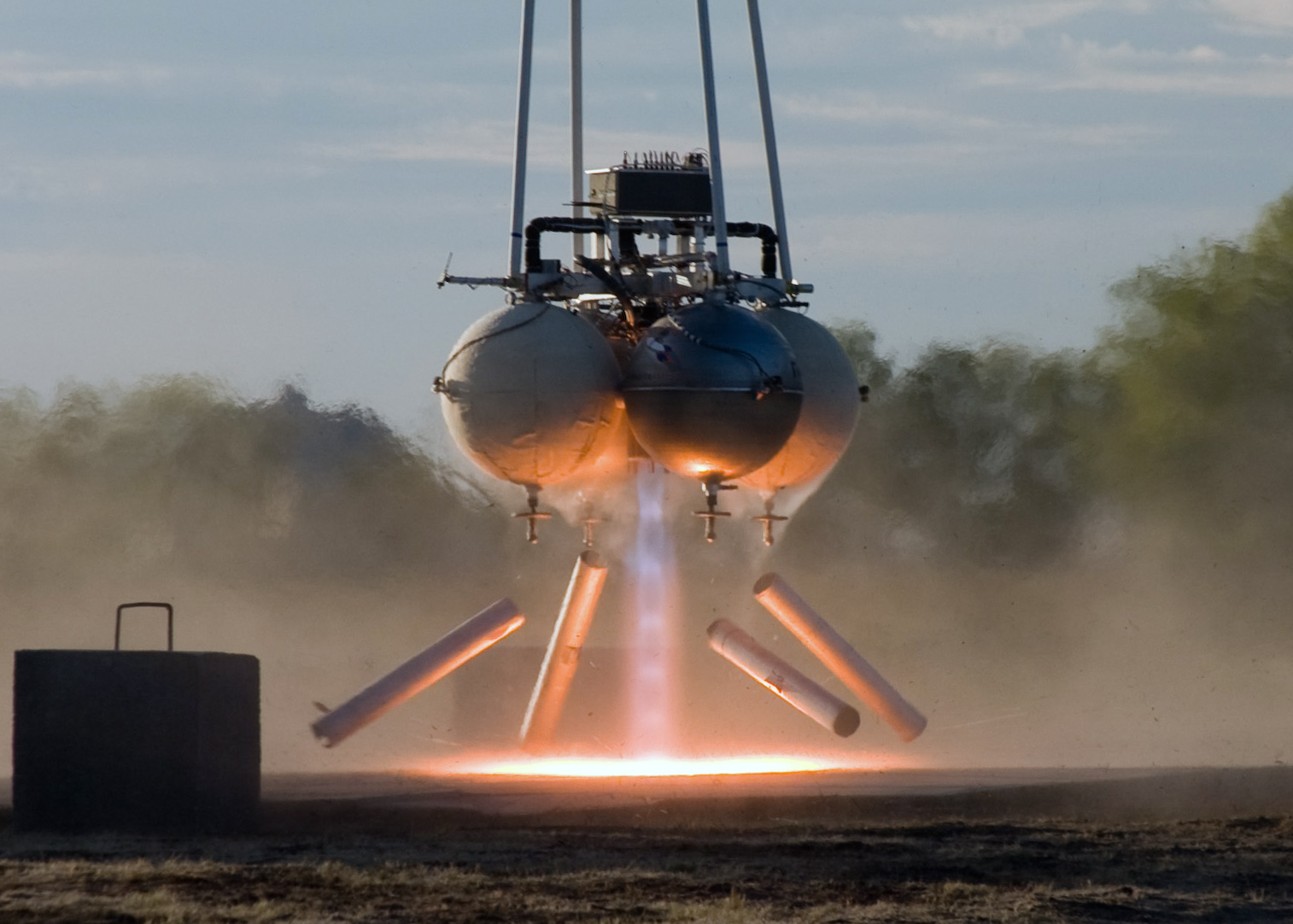
Armadillo Aerospace's "Pixel" in test flights before the 2006 competition

The Northrop Grumman Lunar Lander Challenge (NG-LLC) was a competition funded by NASA's Centennial Challenges program. The competition offered a series of prizes for teams that launch a vertical takeoff/vertical landing (VTVL) rocket that achieved the total delta-v needed for a vehicle to move between the surface of the Moon and its orbit. The multi-level competition was conducted by the X PRIZE Foundation, with sponsorship from the Northrop Grumman Corporation who ran the ongoing competition. The prize purses were paid by NASA. It was held annually at the X PRIZE Cup, making its debut at the 2006 Wirefly X PRIZE Cup in October, 2006, until 2009 when the prize purse was awarded to Masten Space Systems and Armadillo Aerospace.

== Competition rules ==
The competition is divided into two levels. Both levels require teams to demonstrate control of their vehicle by flying to an altitude of more than 50 meters (160 ft), flying laterally for 100 m (330 ft), and landing on a pad. For level 1, this pad is a simple 10 m (33 ft) diameter circle; for level 2, it is a simulated lunar surface, complete with craters and boulders. After completing this first flight, the vehicle can then be refueled, and must then fly a second leg back to the original starting point. Each flight must meet a required minimum flight time of 90 seconds for level 1 and 180 seconds for level 2. For each level, the two flights along with any necessary preparation must be accomplished within a short 150-minute time period. Each Level offered a first- and second-place prize. Level 1 awarded a first place prize purse of $350,000 and a $150,000 purse for second place. The more difficult level 2 awarded first place prize of $1 million and a $500,000 second place prize.

== 2006 ==
2006 was the first year of the competition. It was announced on May 5, 2006, giving teams only a few months to prepare for the late-October competition. Although four teams officially registered for the competition, only one was able to receive the required permit from the FAA before the event. Armadillo Aerospace arrived at the 2006 event, held at Las Cruces International Airport in New Mexico, with two matching vehicles, named Pixel and Texel. In the end, Armadillo made three attempts to win the prize, each one using Pixel. In all three cases, difficult landings left them short of the mission requirements—on two occasions, rough landings caused damage to the vehicle; on a third, the vehicle failed to land completely on the target pad. Team Armadillo left without any prize money, but still had made history by performing the first successful flight of a private vehicle of this class—as well as the first flight under the FAA's new Experimental Permit.

== 2007 ==
The 2007 Lunar Lander Challenge took place on October 27–28 at the Holloman Air Force Base in New Mexico. Micro-Space, one of the teams registered in 2007, had to retreat from the competition after they missed a mandatory meeting. The only team to compete was again Armadillo Aerospace. Armadillo entered their MOD vehicle for level 1. They attempted six flights, but never completed the full profile. A flight on October 27 ended with the vehicle crashing on the return flight. Their final flight attempt on October 28 caused a fire on the launch pad. Team leader John Carmack expressed his disappointment, saying "today is officially a bad day when it comes to our vehicle."

== 2008 ==
The 2008 Lunar Lander Challenge took place October 24–25, back at the Las Cruces International Airport. Two teams competed. Because the X PRIZE Cup was canceled for 2008, the Lunar Lander Challenge was held separately, and was open only to members of the press. It was, however, broadcast live by the official event webcast, SpaceVidcast.

The only teams that flew were Armadillo Aerospace and TrueZer0. Both received waivers from the FAA to fly experimental rockets.

TrueZer0 attempted level 1, achieved hover, then lost roll control and was aborted and crashed.

Armadillo had an unsuccessful first attempt at level 1, and landed early due to inadequate thrust. On their second attempt they completed the first leg, but the second leg was cut short by the FAA closing the flight window. The second leg was held in the afternoon, and they were able to take the Level 1 top prize of $350,000.

Armadillo made an attempt at the level 2 prize on October 25, but had a fuel valve failure, burned through the engine nozzle, and rolled the vehicle at takeoff. They decided not to make another attempt.

== 2009 ==
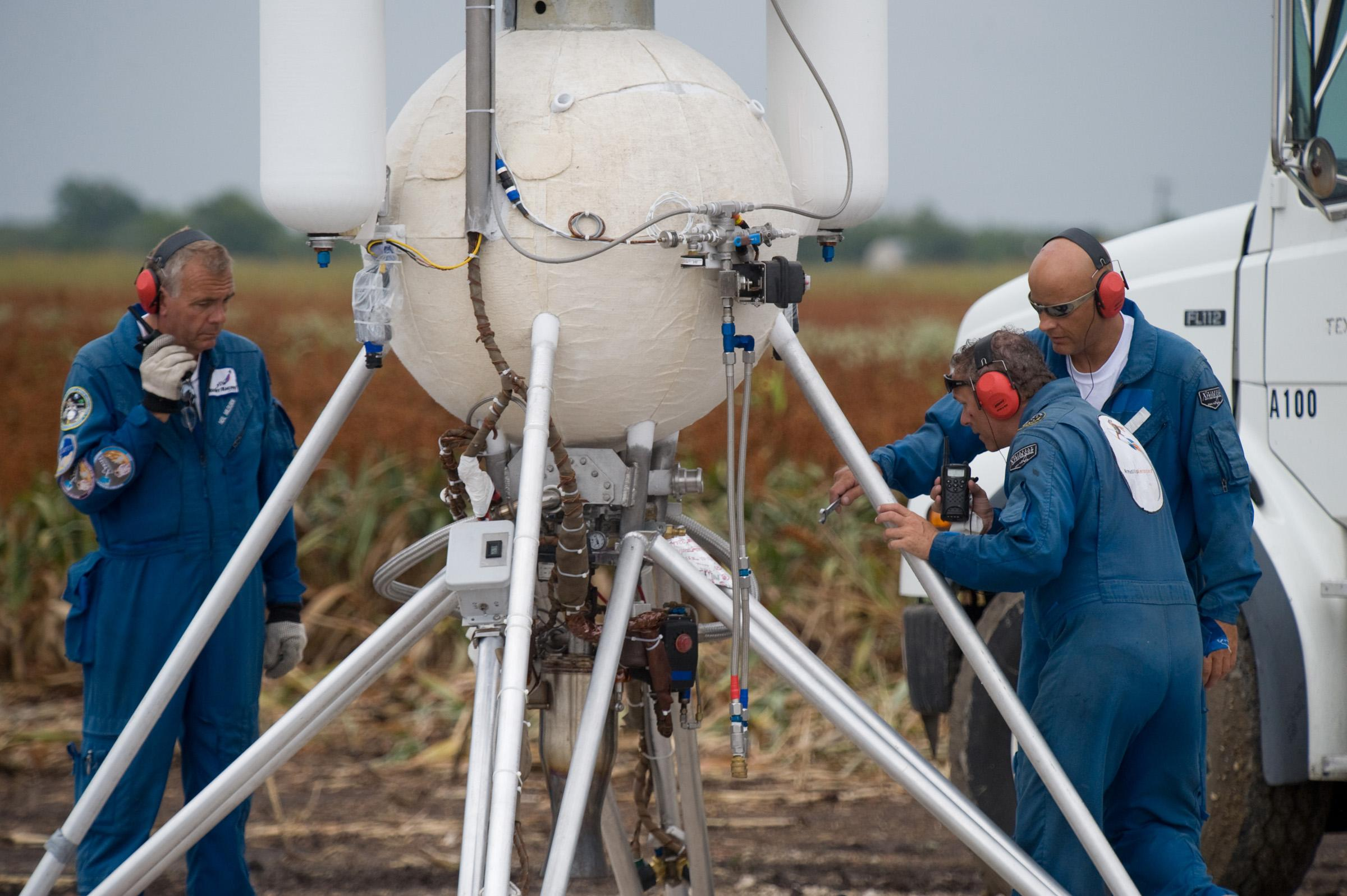
Armadillo Aerospace technicians on the launch pad performing a vehicle inspection

The method of competing in Lunar Lander Challenge was modified for the 2009 competition season to enable teams to compete from different locations, rather than at a single location, as was done in previous seasons. Instead, judges travelled to a location near the applicants' home base. Prize competition attempts were attempted over the course of several days during the LLC season of July 20 to October 31.

The Lunar Lander Challenge concluded this season with the following flights and results:

- Armadillo Aerospace made their attempt for the Level 2 purse from Caddo Mills, Texas, on September 12 and 13, and successfully qualified for the Level 2 prize. The judges would later rule the accuracy of this flight as 2nd place for Level 2.
- Masten Space Systems attempted to win second prize for Level 1 on September 15–16, but aborted after first flight. They successfully flew both legs (Level 1) on October 7 from the Mojave Air & Space Port. The judges would later rule the accuracy of this flight as second place for Level 1.
- BonNovA announced it intended to attempt to claim the Level 1 prize in Cantil, California, on Oct 26th-27th, but cancelled the weekend before the scheduled date.
- Masten Space Systems attempted the Level 2 flights on Oct 28-30 from Mojave. After problems with the computer aborting the launch, a fire after one attempt and overnight repairs, the "Xoie" rocket flew both legs and qualified for Level 2. The judges would later rule the accuracy of this flight as 1st place for Level 2, and awarded the US$1,000,000 Level Two prize to Masten.
- Unreasonable Rocket (Paul Breed, father & son team) attempted to claim purses in both competition levels from Cantil, California on Oct 30 to Nov 1, and did make an 84-second pad-to-pad flight on the Level 1 competition, but did not successfully complete either level.

== List of competitors ==
- Armadillo Aerospace
- BonNova
- Paragon Labs, now www.paragonspace.com
- Team Phoenicia
- TrueZer0
- Unreasonable Rocket
- Masten Space Systems
- SpeedUp

== Winners ==
=== Level 1 ===
- First prize: Armadillo Aerospace 24 October 2008
- Second prize: Masten Space Systems 7 October 2009

=== Level 2 ===
- First prize: Masten Space Systems 30 October 2009
- Second prize: Armadillo Aerospace 12 September 2009

== See also ==
- VTVL
- Blue Origin
- Blue Origin New Shepard
- McDonnell Douglas DC-X
- Lockheed Martin X-33
- VentureStar
- Armadillo Aerospace
- Interorbital Systems
- Quad (rocket)
- Zarya
- Kankoh-maru
- Reusable Vehicle Testing program of the Japanese Space Agency JAXA
- List of private spaceflight companies - A compiled list of private spaceflight companies
- Pressure-fed engine (rocket)
- Google Lunar X PRIZE
- NewSpace
- Project M - NASA's VTVL test vehicle, using a design from this Challenge
- Project Morpheus - a real lunar lander project from NASA, son of Project M and this Challenge
- List of space technology awards
