= Project M (disambiguation) =

Project M is a video game modification of the 2008 fighting game Super Smash Bros. Brawl.

Project M may also refer to:

- Project M (NASA), a proposed project by NASA to send a robonaut to the Moon
- Project M, the fictional creators of DC Comics Creature Commandos
- Project M, developers of the Metroid: Other M game
- ProjectM, an OpenGL version of the music visualizer MilkDrop
