= Matt Ondler =

Matthew Ondler (born April 15, 1963) is the Chief Strategy Officer (CSO) at Aegis Aerospace Inc.. He previously served as the President, Chief Technology Officer (CTO), and Chief Strategy Officer at Axiom Space, a company building the world's first commercial space station. Shortly after Ondler joined Axiom Space, NASA awarded the company a $140M contract and the exclusive right to build its space station off the forward port of the ISS. Prior to Axiom, he was the president and co-founder of Houston Mechatronics. Before that, he served as the lead manager of the software, robotics, and simulation division at NASA's Johnson Space Center. Ondler earned his BS in aerospace engineering from the University of Colorado Boulder. He later moved to Houston, TX, where he began a 28-year career at NASA Johnson Space Center. While at NASA, he achieved an MBA in Finance and Marketing from the University of Houston and completed the Senior Executive Fellows Program at Harvard University.

== Early life ==
Ondler was born and raised in Casper, Wyoming. He graduated from Natrona County High School, the same high school his parents had graduated from two decades earlier.

== Career ==
=== NASA ===
Beginning at NASA, Ondler worked as an aerospace engineer in the Advanced Programs office, contributing to projects such as the Aeroassist Flight Experiment (AFE) and Mars Rover Sample Return. He was later named Mission Manager for SPIFEX, a primary Space Shuttle experiment that flew aboard STS-64 from 1992 to 1994. He then served as International Integration Manager for Guidance, Navigation, and Control (GN&C) for the ISS Program, creating and managing the GN&C Hardware/Software Integration Test Facility in 1996, which remains in use today. From 1997 to 2001, he was Deputy Branch Chief of the GN&C branch. In 1999, he led the Abort Improvement Team in the Space Shuttle Program office, successfully eliminating all ascent loss of vehicle/loss of crew abort scenarios, closing all abort "black zones." He later served as Deputy Division Chief of the Aeroscience and Flight Mechanics Division until 2006. In 2006, he led the Biomedical Systems Division, overseeing over 1,000 pieces of crew-related health and medical equipment. In 2007, Ondler was appointed to lead the Software, Robotics, and Simulation Division, renowned for its leadership in robotics. Under his tenure, the division produced Robonaut 2, Lunar Electric Rover, Valkyrie, and other robotic breakthroughs.

Ondler then managed NASA's Project Morpheus, a VTVL rocket landing test platform and a project to send a humanoid robot to the moon, based on the operational Robonaut 2. According to SpaceNews, Ondler pitched the mission concept, though official support was limited. The project was backed by Johnson Space Center Engineering Director Stephen Altemus. The program, using relatively little funding, successfully flew the lander prototype multiple times, demonstrating the viability of a low-cost lander. Ondler stated to Space.com that the program demonstrated NASA's ability to work efficiently with limited resources to build a substantial program.

After 28 years of service, Ondler left NASA as the Assistant Director of Engineering at the Johnson Space Center.

Ondler is the recipient of NASA's Outstanding Leadership Medal and NASA Exceptional Achievement Medal.

=== Executive work ===
After his 28-year career at NASA, Ondler performed business and proposal development, strategic planning, program management, led corporate innovation initiatives, and served as the company deputy chief engineer for Stinger Ghaffarian Technologies, a $600 million-a-year engineering services company.

In March 2014, he co-founded Houston Mechatronics, a firm specializing in mechatronics and robotics, where he served as president and CEO, overseeing all company activities and functions. Under his leadership, Houston Mechatronics raised two funding rounds, including a Series B investment of $20M from Schlumberger and Transocean International at a valuation of $60M. The company developed Aquanaut, a transformative subsea robot designed for commercial work in oil and gas and critical tasks for the United States Department of Defense.

In 2025, Ondler joined Aegis Aerospace Inc. as Chief Strategy Officer, bringing his extensive experience in aerospace engineering, program management, and strategic planning to the company’s leadership team based in Houston, near NASA’s Johnson Space Center. At Aegis, he contributes to the company’s efforts in commercial, civil space, and defense services, including payloads on the Moon and the development of a university-dedicated research facility in space.
