= Armadillo Aerospace =

American aerospace startup company

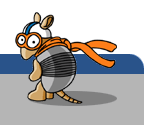
- Type: Privately held
- Industry: Aerospace
- Founded: 2000
- Founder: John Carmack
- Fate: Out of business
- Successor: Exos Aerospace
- Headquarters: Mesquite, Texas
- Key people: John Carmack
- Products: Rocket vehicles/space tourism
- Website: www.armadilloaerospace.com

Armadillo Aerospace was an aerospace startup company based in Mesquite, Texas. Its initial goal was to build a crewed suborbital spacecraft capable of space tourism, and it had also stated long-term ambitions of orbital spaceflight. The company was founded by John Carmack, co-founder and former chief technical officer of id Software.

On October 24, 2008, Armadillo won $350,000 by succeeding in the Level 1 Northrop Grumman Lunar Lander Challenge. On September 12, 2009, Armadillo won $500,000 by succeeding in Level 2 of the same challenge.

In 2010, they signed an exclusive deal with Space Adventures. Armadillo Aerospace was to provide a suborbital rocket to fly tourists into space, while Space Adventures would sell tickets for the experience.

In August 2013, Carmack announced that Armadillo Aerospace had been put in "hibernation mode", following setbacks including the crash of the STIG-B rocket in January 2013.

In May 2014, several former employees of Armadillo Aerospace formed a new company, Exos Aerospace, which was created to carry their former company's research into reusable commercial spacecraft. The new company set up their operations in one of Armadillo's former facilities at the Caddo Mills Municipal Airport, in Texas. Exos completed acquisition of Armadillo assets in early 2015, and intended to begin launches of the Suborbital Active Rocket with Guidance (SARGE) in 2016 from Spaceport America in New Mexico. SARGE will be an enhanced Armadillo STIG-B. The first flight of SARGE took place in 2018 from Spaceport America.

In September 2017, John Carmack retweeted a post about SpaceX rocket bloopers, along with his post "I showed all of our crashes at the beginning of Armadillo Aerospace, but everyone thought it was a terrible idea and talked me out of it." In the comment section, one person asked if there's chance of comeback for Armadillo Aerospace. He subsequently replied that there is the chance that he might "want to try at some point" with his own scheme, giving a sign that Armadillo Aerospace could someday return from hibernation mode.

== Research and development principles ==
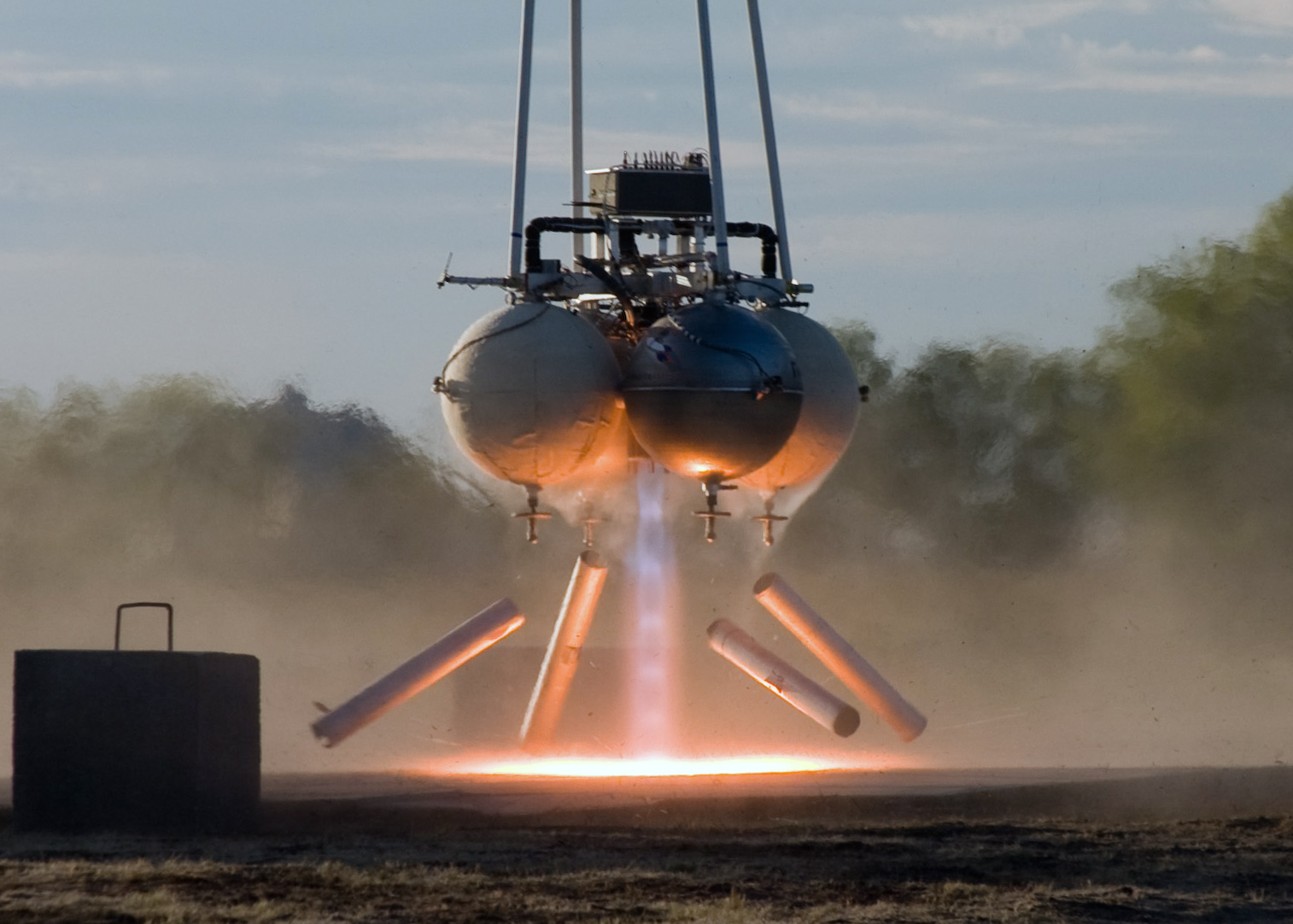
Captive test flight of Armadillo Aerospace's Pixel rocket before the 2006 X-Prize Cup

The company placed a strong emphasis on a rapid build and test cycle. Armadillo Aerospace designed and built more than 12 vehicles which used about 50 engine designs for over 100 rocket flights. Each design had several features in common. One was the use of modern computer technologies and electronics to simplify rocket control and reduce development costs. Another was the use of liquid propellants and VTVL to facilitate short launch-to-launch times.

== Prize competitions ==
=== X-Prize competition ===
The company was a competitor for the Ansari X-Prize. Armadillo's X-Prize vehicle was unorthodox among modern rockets in that instead of using stabilization fins, which complicate the design and increase drag, Armadillo used an aerodynamically unstable design, where the computer controlled jet vanes based on feedback from fibre optic gyroscopes. Armadillo stated a preference for simplicity and reliability over performance, which was evident in its choice of hydrogen peroxide (50% concentration in water) and methanol as a mixed monopropellant for the vehicle. A monopropellant-based engine requires only a single tank as well as greatly simplified plumbing and other hardware.

=== Wirefly X-Prize Cup 2006 ===
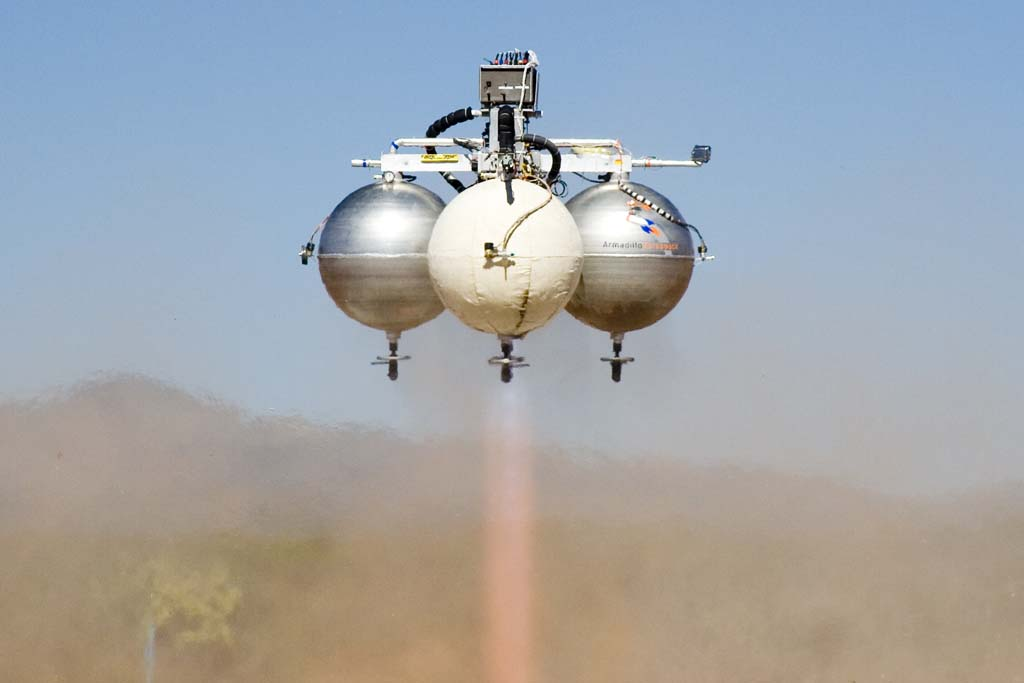
Pixel attempting level 1. White tanks are insulated and contain liquid oxygen, grey tanks contain ethanol.

Armadillo Aerospace competed in the 2006 X PRIZE Cup. Armadillo Aerospace was the only competitor in the Lunar Lander Challenge. The company took two similar vehicles, Pixel and Texel, to the event. The vehicles narrowly failed to win the Level 1 prize, after making three dramatic attempts totalling over 5 minutes in the air, finally crashing out on the final attempt. Persistent landing problems were the main cause of failure, with the undercarriage breaking several times, and landing slightly off the pad on one occasion due to guidance difficulties. These flights were a highlight of the Wirefly X-prize cup.

==== Quad vehicle ====
The quad vehicle design is pressure-fed in blow down mode from an initial pressure of 320 psi for level 1 (400 psi level 2). The roll thrusters are cross-fed by gas drawn from ullage space of the opposite tank. The vehicle is able to transfer propellant through connecting pipes between opposite tanks by controlling ullage pressures with the thrusters; this helps it balance, minimizing gas use. The main engine has two-axis thrust vectoring. The vehicle is fully computer controlled; with guidance from GPS and fiber optic gyroscopes.

=== Wirefly X-Prize Cup 2007 ===
Armadillo Aerospace competed in the 2007 Lunar Lander Challenge event in the Wirefly X-Prize Cup 2007.

==== Testing ====
During testing one of the two Quad vehicles (named Texel) crashed on a tethered flight after a guidance problem caused the vehicle to rapidly gain altitude until 3 separate flight termination procedures were activated at approximately 20–30 feet. The vehicle fell, and the impact broke open one of the alcohol tanks and a large fireball engulfed the vehicle. The vehicle was irreparably damaged, and only its sister Pixel could compete in the upcoming event. The plan was to have the first module (of the next generation modular design) compete at level 1, and have Pixel compete at level 2 challenge.

==== Competition ====
In the level 1 events, Armadillo's craft MOD (actually, module #1) logged several attempts, including several successful first leg flights but was unable to complete the return trip during any attempt.

On its first attempt, a clogged igniter orifice prevented ignition. On the second attempt, the first leg flight was perfect; increased guidance and control capabilities allowed the module to, in Carmack's words, 'burn the X-mark off the target pad'. The return leg was delayed slightly, because the igniter had clogged again. When the second leg was attempted, a 'hard start' cracked the graphite combustion chamber. As the vehicle was still flying, Carmack flew the crippled vehicle through the course as quickly as possible and hovered 2–3 meters above the landing pad. With only a few seconds remaining in the required flight time, the damaged combustion chamber cracked again, which caused the vehicle to tilt enough to trigger a computer abort. The vehicle performed an auto-land, but the tilt caused the module to tip over on landing after only 82 seconds in the air.

The second attempt began with another perfect first leg, but the return was marred by another hard start. Seeing that the engine was badly damaged (although flying), the team commanded an abort. The module landed back on the pad after only a few seconds.

On the final attempt, MOD suffered a violent "hard start", resulting in engine explosion. The violence of the explosion embedded a piece of the graphite chamber in the ground 64 meters from the launch pad and ended their attempts in 2007 for the prize.

=== Lunar Lander Challenge 2008 ===
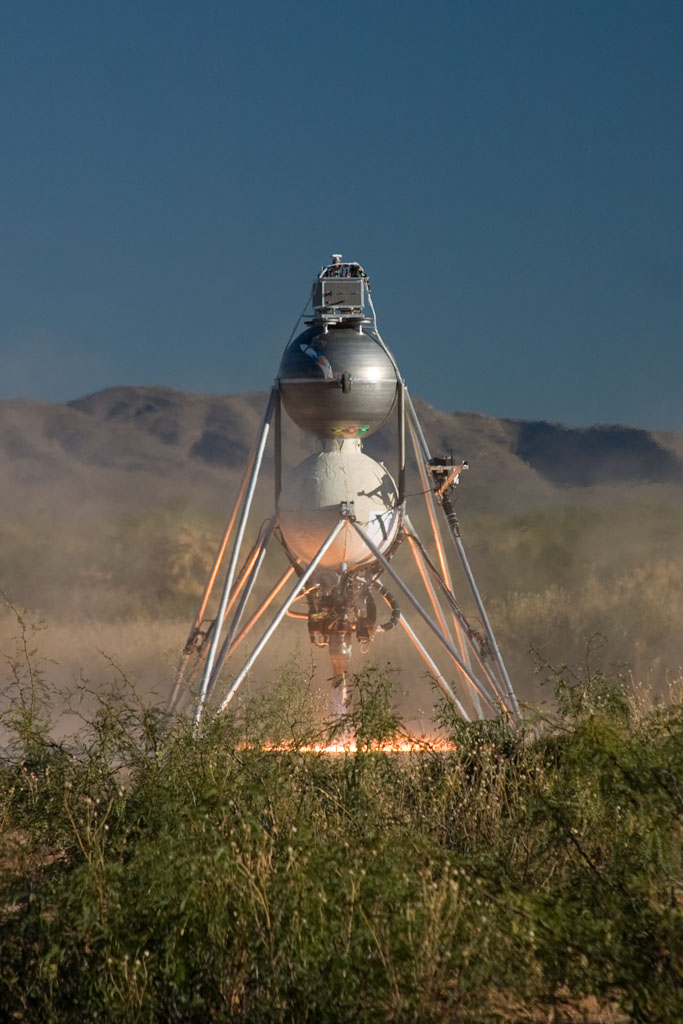
"Mod" vehicle taking off at LLC 2008

The 2008 Lunar Lander Challenge took place October 24–25 at the Las Cruces International Airport in New Mexico. Armadillo Aerospace competed for the third year but for the first time had competition, from the TrueZer0 team. Both received waivers from the FAA to fly experimental rockets.

TrueZero attempted level 1, achieved hover, then lost roll control and was aborted and crashed.

Armadillo had an unsuccessful first attempt at level 1 and landed early due to inadequate thrust. On their second attempt they completed the first leg, but the second leg was cut short by the FAA closing the flight window. The second leg was held in the afternoon, and they were able to take the Level 1 top prize of $350,000.

Armadillo's attempt at the level 2 prize on October 25 was aborted due to their vehicle toppling over after the engine casing burned through due to a fuel-line problem.

=== Lunar Lander Challenge 2009 ===
Armadillo attempted the Level 2 prize on September 12, 2009. Armadillo successfully flew both legs with their Mod vehicle, each flight lasting over 180 seconds, landing safely. However their landing accuracy was not sufficient to win the first prize, instead they won the US$500,000 second prize while Masten Space Systems' Xoie lander won the US$1,000,000 Level 2 first prize.

== Rocket Racing League ==
In 2008, the Rocket Racing League announced that Armadillo Aerospace engines would be used in a second generation of X-Racer aircraft. As of March 2010, the Rocket Racing League was utilizing a highly modified Velocity XL FG airframe and an Armadillo Aerospace 2,500 pound thrust liquid oxygen (LOX) and ethanol rocket engine in both the Mark-II X-Racer and Mark-III X-Racer demonstration vehicles. The Rocket Racing league never got out of its early development mode, and no racing season was ever held.

== Vehicles ==
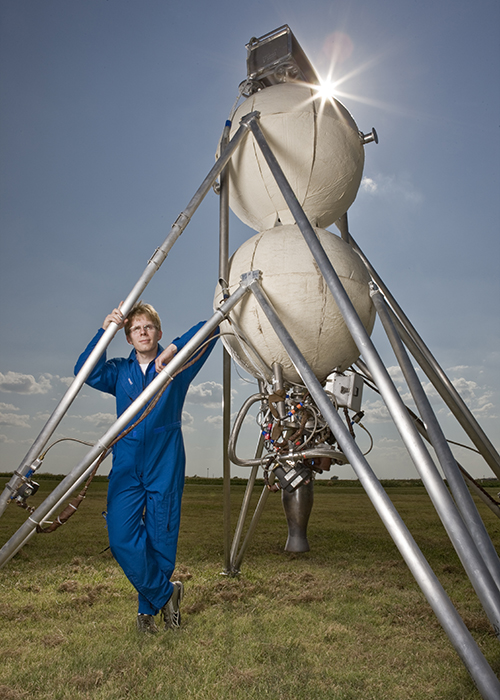
John Carmack with Mod vehicle in 2008

=== Super Mod ===
The Super Mod reusable launch vehicle is a vertical-takeoff, vertical-landing (VTVL) uncrewed rocket which was developed by Armadillo in 2010–2011. It was submitted to NASA as a potential suborbital vehicle for use as a suborbital reusable launch vehicle (sRLV) under NASA's Flight Opportunities Program. It added aerodynamic fairings, partially extendable landing legs with lower aerodynamic drag, and systems improvements to the basic Mod vehicle structure and systems.

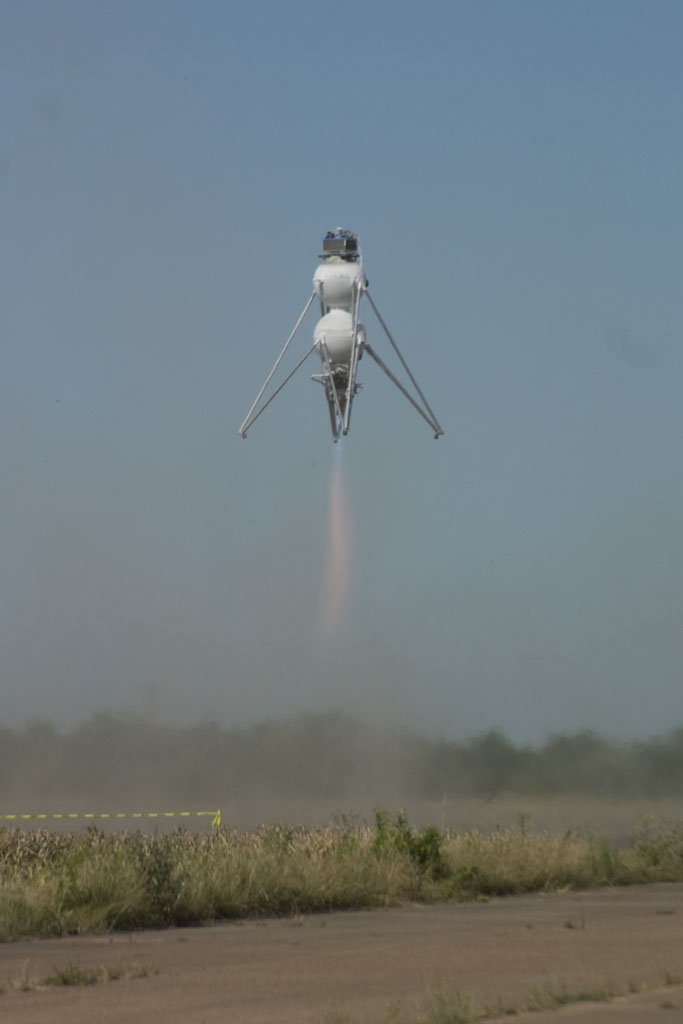
Lunar Lander Cup era Mod rocket hovering in free flight

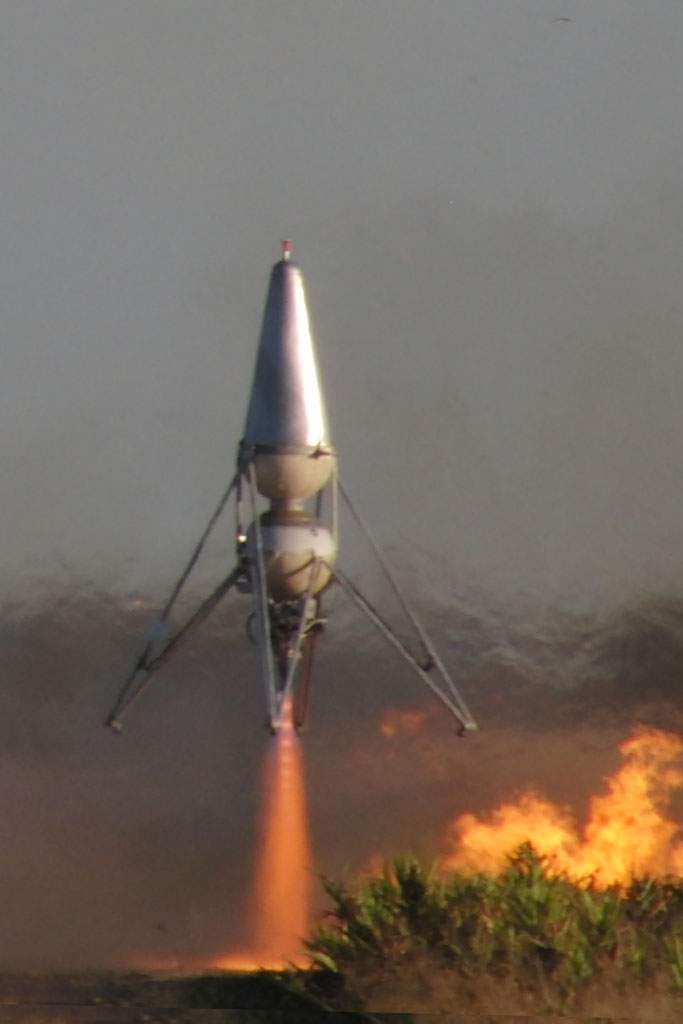
The Mod rocket with an early nose cone, hovering in free flight

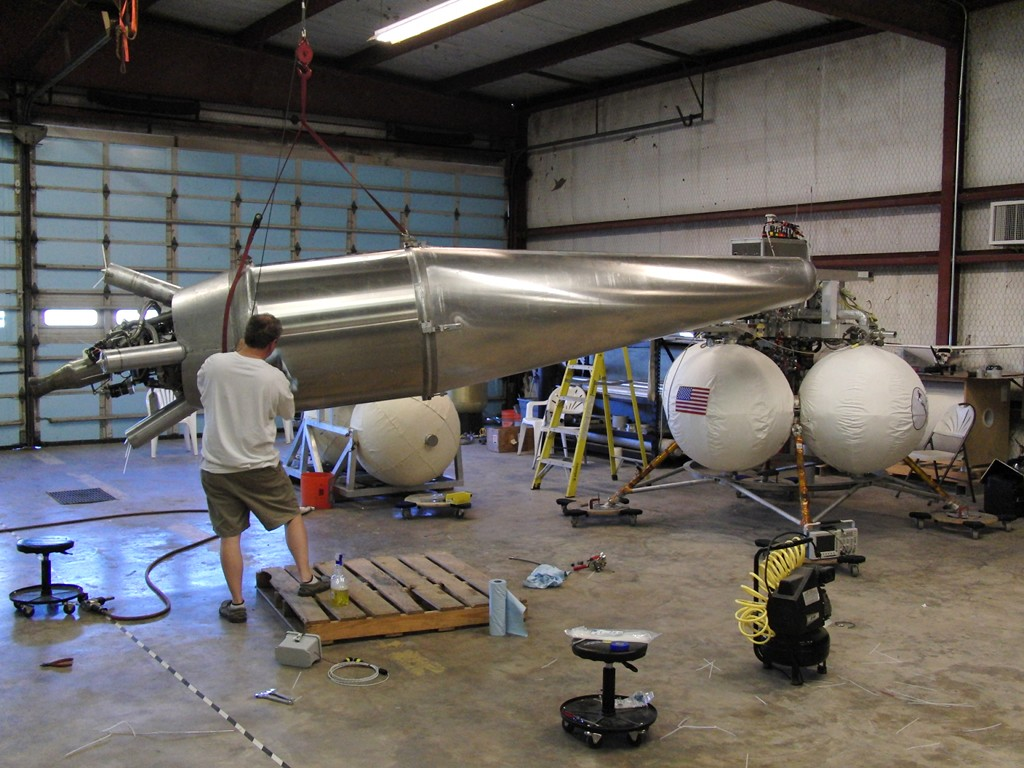
The SuperMod rocket during final assembly

=== Stig ===
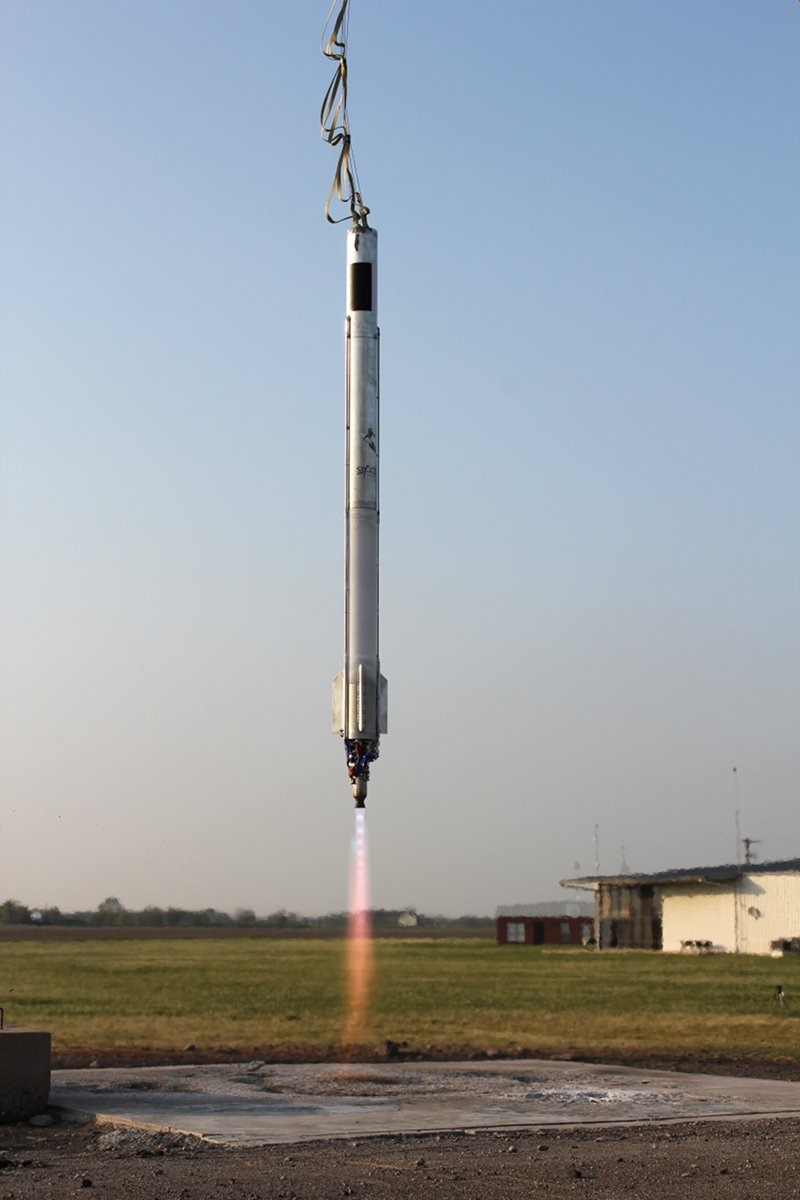
The Armadillo Stig hovering in a tethered test flight

In late 2010, Armadillo started development of a new, longer rocket design created for lower-drag, higher-speed high-altitude flights, which they named Stig in homage of the Top Gear driver The Stig. This rocket had similar systems, motors, and component weights as the Super Mod vehicles but was aerodynamically optimized for high-altitude flights with long 15 inches (38 cm) diameter cylindrical tanks instead of larger spherical tanks. The second flight, which took place in 2012, reached 50 miles (82 kilometers), but the recovery chute did not work as planned.

The third flight took place in January 2013, and the vehicle experienced a hard landing following a parachute failure-to-deploy, though the launch was successful.

== Staff and funding ==
Armadillo was headed, and largely funded, by John Carmack, a developer of video games including the Doom and Quake series. During its early days, all of its employees (including Carmack) had other, full-time jobs and contributed their efforts twice weekly to Armadillo on a voluntary basis. Armadillo had a relatively small budget and was not supported by aerospace companies or agencies like NASA, ESA, or Boeing. Armadillo Aerospace publicly declared itself fully self-funded.

In February 2006, Carmack stated that the program to date had cost slightly over $2 million. Even by the standards of X-Prize candidates, this is a low budget. Scaled Composites is estimated to have spent $25 million on its SpaceShipOne development program.

On August 8, 2006, Armadillo Aerospace announced that it had reached a sponsorship deal with Nvidia. While details were sparse, John Carmack said, "There is a chance at this point that I may have written the last personal cheque I need to for Armadillo."

In April 2008, Carmack offered an updated figure of "total cost to date, about $3.5 million." He estimated that another $2 million would be needed to achieve a crewed flight to 100 km using Armadillo's modular design in a "six-pack" configuration.

By 2010, Armadillo had 7 full-time employees and was profitable on ongoing operations (though Carmack was continuing to invest in development efforts).

The company mascot was an armadillo named Widget.

=== 2013 "Hibernation mode" and sale of assets ===
In August 2013, Carmack indicated that following the crash of the STIG-B rocket earlier that year, he had wound down the company operations and had put the company in "hibernation mode." Armadillo had stopped accepting (profitable) contract R&D work two years prior in order to focus on development of a suborbital reusable rocket. During those two years, Armadillo operated at an approximately US$1 million per year burn rate funded personally by Carmack. Several reasons were offered for this outcome, including a failure to adopt a multi-test-vehicle build strategy, making the loss of a single rocket more significant than it would have otherwise been.

As of August 2013, Carmack was "actively looking for outside investors to restart work on the company’s rockets."

In 2015, the assets of Armadillo Aerospace were sold to EXOS Aerospace Systems & Technologies, Inc.

== Future research ==
Carmack stated in his monthly reports and in forum posts that he expected his path to an orbital vehicle to include modular rockets similar to OTRAG technology. Lutz Kayser, the founding engineer of OTRAG, visited Armadillo in May 2006 and loaned Carmack some of their original research hardware.

"I have been corresponding with Lutz for a few months now, and I have learned quite a few things. I seriously considered an OTRAG style massive-cluster-of-cheap-modules orbital design back when we had 98% peroxide (assumed to be a biprop with kerosene), and I have always considered it one of the viable routes to significant reduction in orbital launch costs. After really going over the trades and details with Lutz, I am quite convinced that this is the lowest development cost route to significant orbital capability. Eventually, reusable stages will take over, but I actually think that we can make it all the way to orbit on our current budget by following this path. The individual modules are less complicated than our current vehicles, and I am becoming more and more fond of high production methods over hand crafter prototypes." -- June 2006 Armadillo Aerospace Update

== See also ==
External images
- Gallery of CCA3 images and video Official Youtube channel

- Alt.space
- NewSpace
- List of private spaceflight companies
  - Masten Space Systems – American aerospace company
  - Interorbital Systems – American aerospace company
  - Blue Origin
- Space Fellowship – hosts the official Armadillo Aerospace Forum
- Reusable Vehicle Testing – program of the Japanese Space Agency JAXA
- Commercial Spaceflight Federation
- Blue Origin New Shepard
- McDonnell Douglas DC-X – Prototype single-stage-to-orbit rocket developed & flown between 1991-1996
- Lockheed Martin X-33 – Uncrewed re-usable spaceplane technology demonstrator for the VentureStar
- VentureStar – Human-rated re-usable spaceplane concept
- Quad (rocket) – VTVL technology demonstrator
- Zarya – Soviet orbital vehicle design
- Kankoh-maru – Japanese orbital vehicle design
- Lunar Lander Challenge – Competition funded by NASA's Centennial Challenges program
