= Reusable Vehicle Testing =

Japanese reusable rocket testing project

RVT
- Function: Technology demonstrator for liquid propulsion based VTOL rocket flight
- Manufacturer: ISAS/JAXA
- Country of origin: Japan

The Reusable Vehicle Testing (RVT) project was conducted by the Japan Aerospace Exploration Agency (JAXA) from 1998 until 2003. The project involved a series of experimental vehicles to test repeated flights of a reusable rocket. Four complete vehicles were developed during the project. The design of the experimental vehicles addressed various technical challenges for future reusable launch vehicles (RLV) such as flight on demand, quick turnaround, higher performance, lightweight structures and materials.

The project involved ground and flights tests with the flight testing conducted at the Institute of Space and Astronautical Science (ISAS) Noshiro Rocket Testing Center in the northern part of Japan's main island.

JAXA proposed to develop a reusable high altitude rocket based on the technologies demonstrated in the RVT project. The rocket would take a payload of about 100 kg to an altitude of 100 km. RVT-derived equipment such as engines and attitude control will be used. The development and flight testing is expected to take 5 years and the cost is estimated at 50 billion yen. The rocket, capable of five flights in a day. The cost per flight, based on 2500 flights, is expected to be 10,000 yen, reducing the per flight cost compared to current day expendable rocket systems, which cost between 2 and 6 billion yen. The experimental payloads will be recovered after the flight, which will also minimize costs for the payload developer. Moreover, it will be possible to stop and hover the vehicle at any altitude, which is impossible with conventional sounding rockets.

== See also ==
- McDonnell Douglas DC-X
- CORONA
- Kankoh-maru
- Winged Reusable Sounding rocket
- Grasshopper
- Blue Origin and its New Shepard rocket
- Armadillo Aerospace and Quad (rocket)
- Lunar Lander Challenge
- Project Morpheus, NASA program to continue developing ALHAT and Quad landers
