= Zarya (space capsule) =

Soviet orbital vehicle design

Zarya (spacecraft)
- Country of origin: USSR
- Operator: Soviet space program
- Applications: Carry passengers and supplies to low Earth orbit and back

Specifications
- Regime: Low Earth orbit

Production
- Status: Canceled, 1989
- Launched: None

Related spacecraft
- Derived from: Soyuz

The Zarya spacecraft (Russian: Заря, lit. 'Dawn') was a secret Soviet project of the late 1980s aiming to design and build a large crewed vertical-takeoff, vertical-landing (VTVL) reusable space capsule, a much larger replacement for the Soyuz (spacecraft). The project was developed during the years of 1985–1989 by Energia corporation until it was shelved in 1989, "on the eve of the Soviet Union's collapse" due to lack of funding. The name of the project was later reused by the Zarya space station module which served as the first component of International Space Station in 1998.

== Design ==
The Zarya spacecraft would have differed from all previous spacecraft by having an array of a dozen rocket engines for making a soft landing upon return to Earth, without using a parachute.

== Mission ==
The Zarya spacecraft would have brought crew and supplies to Mir or supplies only in an uncrewed mode. It would have had a normal crew size of one or two, and offered the possibility of carrying a maximum of eight to twelve if used in a lifeboat configuration.

== Timeline ==
1985 January 27

- Preliminary design work began on the Zarya "Super Soyuz". The concept was a reusable spacecraft, launched by Zenit launch vehicle. with all but a small ring of retro rockets being recovered in the landing module, while also being able to deliver cargo to and from orbit. Carriage in payload bay of Buran shuttle was also a requirement for the program.

1986 December 22

- Zarya "Super Soyuz" briefed to the Military-Industrial Commission.

During 1989

- Zarya "Super Soyuz" cancelled on financial grounds.

== See also ==
- McDonnell Douglas DC-X – Prototype single-stage-to-orbit rocket developed & flown between 1991-1996
- Reusable Vehicle Testing – Japanese reusable rocket testing project
- Quad (rocket) – VTVL technology demonstrator
- Project Morpheus – NASA vertical landing and takeoff test vehicle
- New Shepard – Rocket developed by Blue Origin
- Kankoh-maru – Japanese orbital vehicle design
- CORONA (SSTO) – Russian prototype reusable single-stage-to-orbit launch vehicle
- Falcon 9 prototypes – Test vehicles developed by SpaceX
