= Autonomous Landing Hazard Avoidance Technology =

NASA technology

ALHAT
| Description | Size | Ref |
| Lighting conditions | any | |
| Global landing precision | ±90 m | |
| Local landing precision | ±3 m | |
| detects hazard elevation (rocks) | > 30 cm | |
| detects hazard slopes | > 5° | |
| Dimensions | (TBD) | – |
| Mass | 400 lb | |
| Class of lasers | IV | |

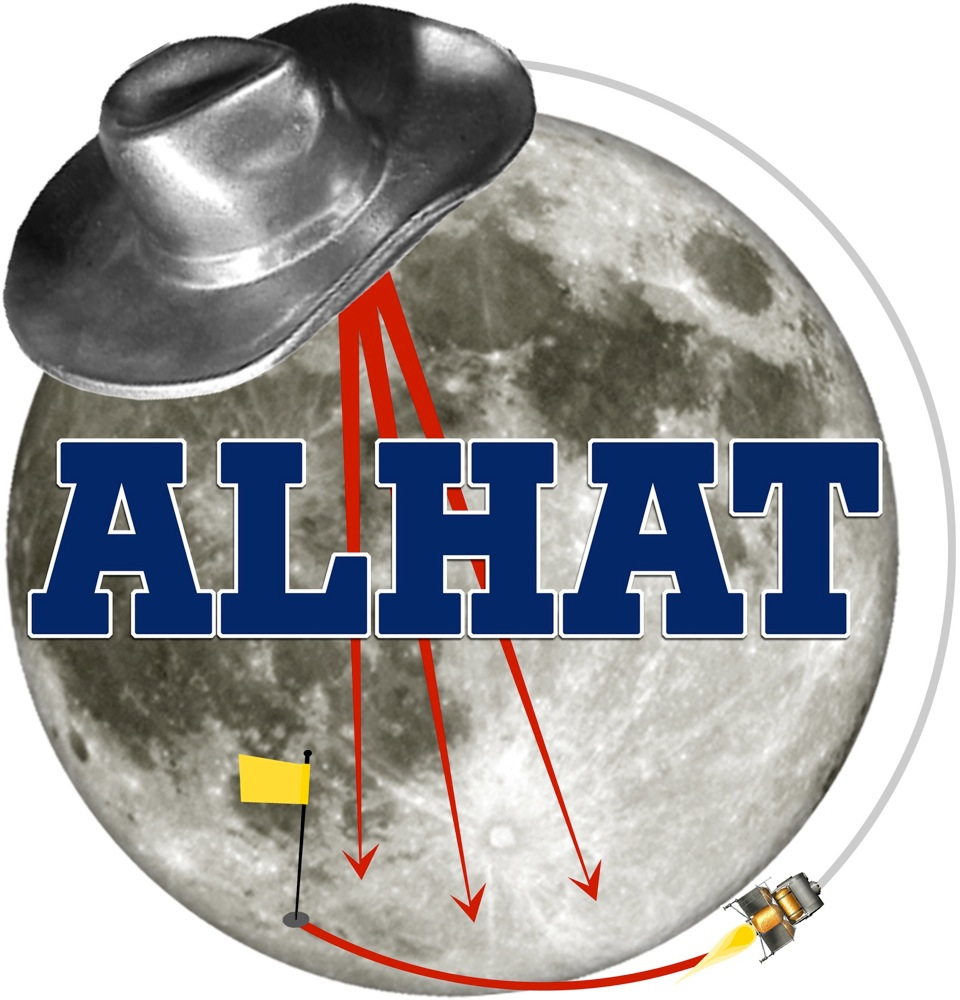
Autonomous Landing and Hazard Avoidance Technologies (ALHAT) Project logo

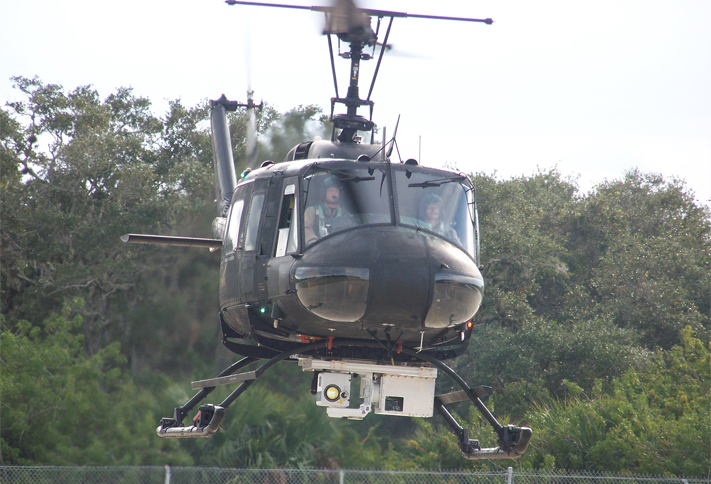
Photograph of the ALHAT automatic landing equipment being tested using a helicopter.

Autonomous Landing Hazard Avoidance Technology (ALHAT) is technology NASA is developing to autonomously land spacecraft on the Moon, Mars or even an asteroid.

According to the NASA web page on the project, it will provide state-of-the-art automated descent and landing system for planetary lander craft. A surface-tracking sensor suite with real-time hazard avoidance capabilities will assess altitude and velocity of the descending vehicle and the topography of the landing site to permit precision landing. The descending craft will use the ALHAT algorithms combined with sensor data to navigate to the "pre-mission landing aim point," where it will autonomously identify safe landing areas and guide the craft to touchdown. The technology will work in any lighting conditions, from the harsh glare of an unshielded Sun to the cloudy, gaseous murk of a distant Solar System body.

A landing craft equipped with ALHAT will have the ability to detect and avoid obstacles such as craters, rocks and slopes and land safely and precisely on a surface. The project is led by Johnson Space Center (JSC) and supported by Jet Propulsion Laboratory (JPL) and Langley Research Center. Some of the sensors may also be used to help spacecraft dock.

The ALHAT technologies include a Hazard Detection System, a lidar Doppler velocimeter, a laser altimeter, software, sensor algorithms and path-to-space computer processors. These technologies integrate with the lander's onboard navigation instrumentation. The equipment has a mass of 400 lb (180 kg).

The instrumentation has been tested by operating from moving vehicles – a truck, NASA's Huey helicopter and the Project Morpheus lander. At the end of testing the project is aiming for the ALHAT equipment to have reached Technology Readiness Level (TRL) 6.

The ALHAT project has been superseded by NASA's CoOperative Blending of Autonomous Landing Technologies (COBALT) project. NASA claim that COBALT's Navigation Doppler Lidar (NDL) is 60 percent smaller, operates at nearly triple the speed and provides longer range measurement.

== Technology ==
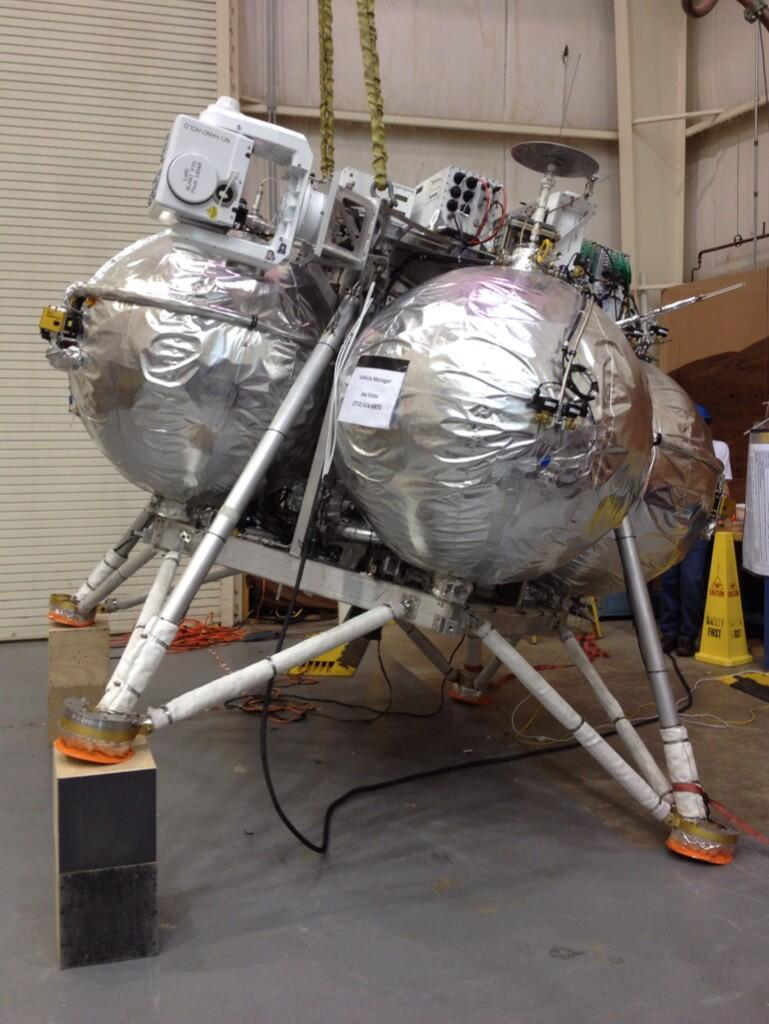
Testing to ensure the ALHAT can still target when tilted. It is integrated into a Morpheus lander.

Resources needed by future expeditions will frequently be situated in potentially hazardous terrain, consequently robotic and human explorers need to land safely near to these resources. This requires a new generation of planetary landers with the ability to automatically recognize their desired landing site, assess potential landing hazards and adjust as they descend to the surface. NASA Langley created three lidar (light radar) sensors: the flash lidar, Doppler lidar and high-altitude laser altimeter for the ALHAT project.

The flash lidar uses imagery technology to detect objects larger than the size of a basketball on a planetary surface under all lighting conditions. If there is an obstacle, the System will divert the vehicle to a safer landing spot. The three-dimensional camera sensor engine also forms part of the DragonEye space camera used by the Dragon spacecraft to dock with the International Space Station.

The flash lidar flashes a laser and acts like a flash camera permitting the generation of lidar maps and images. The Doppler lidar measures the vehicle's altitude and velocity to precisely land on the surface, and the high-altitude laser altimeter provides data enabling the vehicle to land in the chosen area. The lidar laser technology scans an area for hazards like craters or rocks before the lander touches down. The onboard system uses the data to build a terrain and elevation map of potential landing sites in real time. ALHAT first scans from a high altitude giving the spacecraft sufficient to respond to obstacles or craters at the landing site. Safe sites are designated based on factors including the tilt angle of the surface, the distance and fuel cost to get to a site and the position of the lander's footpads.

== History and plans ==
NASA's Johnson Space Center leads the ALHAT project, begun in early 2006, for NASA's Exploration Technology Development Program. Support is also provided by Charles Stark Draper Labs and the Johns Hopkins Applied Physics Laboratory, Baltimore. Langley designed two special-purpose light detection and ranging (lidar) sensors. In conjunction with this, NASA's Jet Propulsion Laboratory developed algorithms for analysing the terrain based upon these lidar measurements.

The Advanced Exploration Systems program would like to fully demonstrate and space qualify an enhanced ALHAT by launching a Morpheus lander with the ALHAT system to the Moon on the 2017 launch of the Space Launch System. If both work Morpheus intends to use ALHAT to land safely on one of the lunar poles.

Human pilots can be helped by ALHAT technology providing them with much better situational awareness when they land their vehicles.

In July 2013 an air cooled ALHAT was integrated into the Morpheus Lander BRAVO and its guidance software. Successful test flights were made with the vehicle tethered. The ALHAT and team them went to the Kennedy Space Center for free flight testing.

On November 21, 2013 ALHAT on the prototype Morpheus Lander arrived at the KSC for free flight testing. In March 2014 ALHAT and the Bravo lander were integrated again and flight testing performed.

In November 2014 additional ALHAT sensors were fitted to the Morpheus Lander. The new optics permit the Navigation Doppler Lidar to accurately measure the vehicle's velocity relative to the ground. The Morpheus/ALHAT successfully conducted Free Flight 15 (FF15) on December 15, 2015 – a closed-loop ALHAT flight and landing.

The connections between the Morpheus vehicle and ALHAT were documented in ICD (Interface Control Documents).

== Testing ==
A variety of field tests have been performed on the ALHAT equipment. The tests have been designed to demonstrate that the ALHAT equipment has reached TRL 6.

The ALHAT's ability to detect items larger than a baseball from a distance of 2,500 feet (760 m) whilst moving was tested by placing the system on a truck. The ALHAT was able to image and navigate while the team were driving. The larger version of ALHAT was tested using helicopter flights at NASA's Dryden Flight Research Center, Edwards, California in 2010. A lunar terrain field was constructed at Kennedy Space Centre (KSC) for ALHAT on Morpheus lander testing. The field has an array of different terrain features to test ALHAT's ability to detect hazards. Initial testing used the lightweight ALHAT on a helicopter.

A helicopter test of the integrated ALHAT System with the Morpheus avionics was performed over the ALHAT planetary hazard field at KSC. The KSC helicopter tests included flight profiles approximating planetary approaches, with the entire ALHAT system interfaced with all appropriate Morpheus subsystems and operated in real-time. During these helicopter flights, the ALHAT system imaged the simulated lunar terrain. Use of a helicopter permitted most but not all of the testing to be performed. Good data was obtained from all of the sensors. All of the problems detected have been identified and fixed to support future testing on the Morpheus Lander.

In July 2013 the integration of ALHAT with the Project Morpheus lander version 1.5 hardware resumed. Tests included placing the lander on blocks to verify that the ALHAT Inertial Measurement Unit (IMU) worked when tilted. Tilting tests were performed at several different heights and directions.

On July 23, 2013 the Morpheus/ALHAT team successfully completed Tethered Test #26 with the ALHAT integrated into Morpheus' Bravo vehicle. All test objectives were met including ALHAT tracking & imaging. Imaging was performed at several heights. An example of the imaging produced by the LIDAR can be seen in the picture.

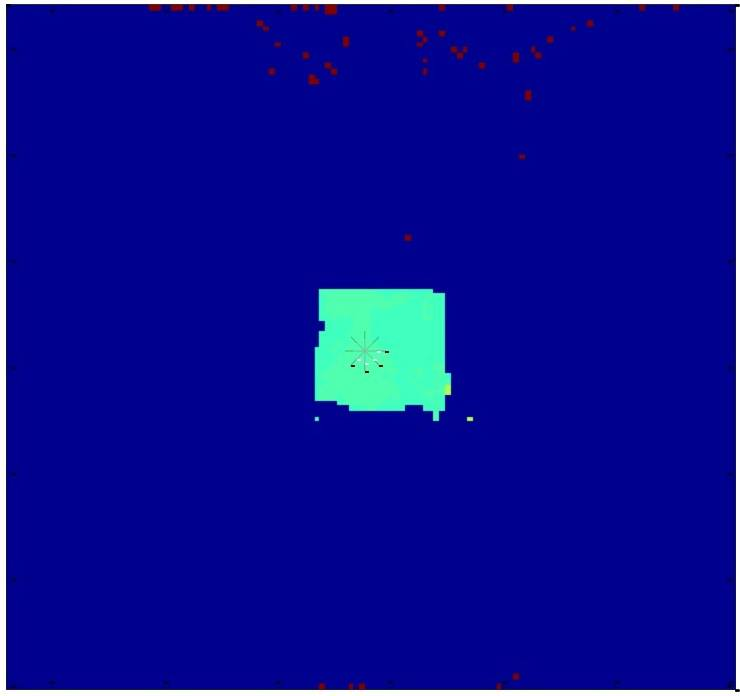
The ALHAT LIDAR imaging system detected and identified the target as a hazard whilst flying as part of a Morpheus lander

On July 27, 2013 Bravo and ALHAT flew again in TT27. The ALHAT's tracking & imaging meeting all of the test objectives.

During the rest of 2013 and early 2014 the ALHAT was removed from Bravo whilst various enhancements were made to the lander and flight tested. In March 2014 the ALHAT was installed back into the lander. On March 27, 2014 the assembly successfully performed a tethered test hovering at a variety of heights. The ALHAT's laser head can be seen scanning the area in the box during TT34 at the top right of this video. Morpheus Free Flight 10 took place on April 2, 2014. The ALHAT was in open loop mode. As well as the flight this video includes shots from a witness camera mounted and carefully aligned to the laser scanning head showing what the laser saw, but in the visible spectrum. Confirming that the hazard field was scanned.

On April 24, 2014 Free Flight 11 (FF11) was successfully completed at the KSC Shuttle Landing Facility (SLF). In FF11, as in FF10, ALHAT operated in open-loop mode, imaging the Hazard Field and calculating navigation solutions in real time during the flight. The equipment was not (yet) navigating the vehicle, meaning Bravo autonomously flew a pre-programmed trajectory as before. ALHAT engineers will use this flight data to continue tuning and improving their system performance.

A swing test was performed on April 28, 2014 to obtain accurate data on ALHAT's 3-beam Navigation Doppler Lidar to calibrate and confirm its range and velocity measurements. Free Flight 12 on April 30, 2014 was a repeat of the previous flight except the Lander was targeting the HDS identified landing site.

Free Flight 13 on May 22, 2014. First flight of ALHAT and Morpheus Lander with the ALHAT having closed loop control of the lander. The correct landing location was identified and flown to. There was a disagreement between the ALHAT and the Morpheus's guidance, navigation, and control over the lander's current location.

Free Flight 14 on May 28, 2014 took place at night. The ALHAT Hazard Detection System (HDS) performed well, but identified a safe site just 0.5 m outside the conservatively established limits around the center of the landing pad. ALHAT then navigated the vehicle in closed-loop mode through the entire approach, with the vehicle taking over navigation during the descent phase of the trajectory when ALHAT was already dead-reckoning. Had less conservative position error limits allowed ALHAT to continue to navigate to landing, the vehicle still would have landed safely on the pad.

On November 13, 2014 a swing test of the new optics for the ALHAT Navigation Lidar was performed. The Morpheus/ALHAT team conducted Free Flight 15 (FF15) on December 15, 2015. The sixth free flight the ALHAT sensor suite on board, and a third attempt at completing a historic closed-loop ALHAT flight. The vehicle flew and landed successfully under the control of the ALHAT.

== Health and safety issues ==
The ALHAT is an electrically powered device so the standard techniques for handling and repairing electrical devices apply.
The equipment contains moving parts which should not be touched when they are moving or powered up.
The Flash LIDAR and altimeter emit Class IV laser beams.

- Safety goggles should be worn when using Class IV and class 3B Lasers. That means whenever the ALHAT is powered up.
- The laser beams shall be directed away from people and anything they could damage.
- Aided optics should not be used.
- During tests and operations the outdoor rules may also apply.

The rules for handling lasers at the Johnson Space Centre can be found in Chapter 6-2 of the JSC Handbook.

Use of the Project Morpheus Thrust Termination System (TTS) by Range Safety shuts down the lander's main engine and stops the Type IV laser in ALHAT's Hazard Detection System (HDS).

== See also ==
- Guidance, navigation, and control
