= Project Morpheus =

NASA vertical landing and takeoff test vehicle

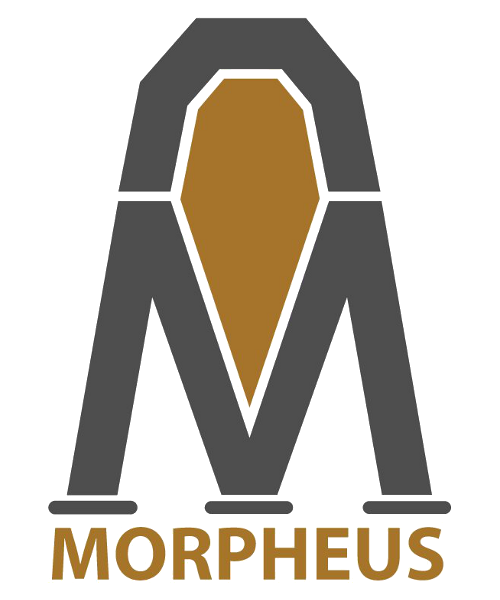
- Country of origin: United States
- Last flight: December 15, 2014
- Designer: NASA
- Manufacturer: NASA/JSC
- Application: Planetary and lunar lander
- Status: Completed

Liquid-fuel engine
- Propellant: liquid oxygen / methane

Performance
- Thrust: 24000 N
- Specific impulse: 321 s
- Burn time: tested: 123 s

Used in
- Morpheus Lander

References
- References: morpheuslander.jsc.nasa.gov

Project Morpheus was a NASA project that began in 2010 to develop a vertical takeoff and vertical landing (VTVL) test vehicle called the Morpheus Lander. It is intended to demonstrate a new nontoxic spacecraft propellant system (methane and oxygen) and an autonomous landing and hazard detection technology. The prototype planetary lander is capable of autonomous flight, including vertical takeoff and landings. The vehicles are NASA-designed robotic landers that will be able to land and take off with 1,100 pounds (500 kg) of cargo on the Moon. The prospect is an engine that runs reliably on propellants that are not only cheaper and safer here on Earth, but could also be potentially manufactured on the Moon and Mars. (See: In-situ resource utilization.)

The Alpha prototype lander was manufactured and assembled at NASA's Johnson Space Center (JSC) and Armadillo Aerospace's facility near Dallas. The prototype lander is a "spacecraft" that is about 12 ft (3.7 m) in diameter, weighs approximately 2,400 lb (1,100 kg) and consists of four silver spherical propellant tanks topped by avionics boxes and a web of wires.

The project is trying out cost and time saving "lean development" engineering practices. Other project activities include appropriate ground operations, flight operations, range safety and the instigation of software development procedures. Landing pads and control centers were also constructed. From the project start in July 2010, about $14 million was spent on materials in the following 4 years; so the Morpheus project is considered lean and low-cost for NASA. In 2012 the project employed 25 full-time team members, and 60 students. At any one time an average of 40 people worked on the project. Project Morpheus devised and used streamlined processes and practices. The Morpheus Lander's last flight was in December 2014. As there were no funds for further flights the lander was returned to JSC in February 2015. Six formal documents were produced by the project. At the end of project review on March 12, 2015, it was estimated that $50 million had been saved by the lean development methods, minimising documentation, and buying parts from Home Depot, MSC Industrial Direct, and W. W. Grainger.

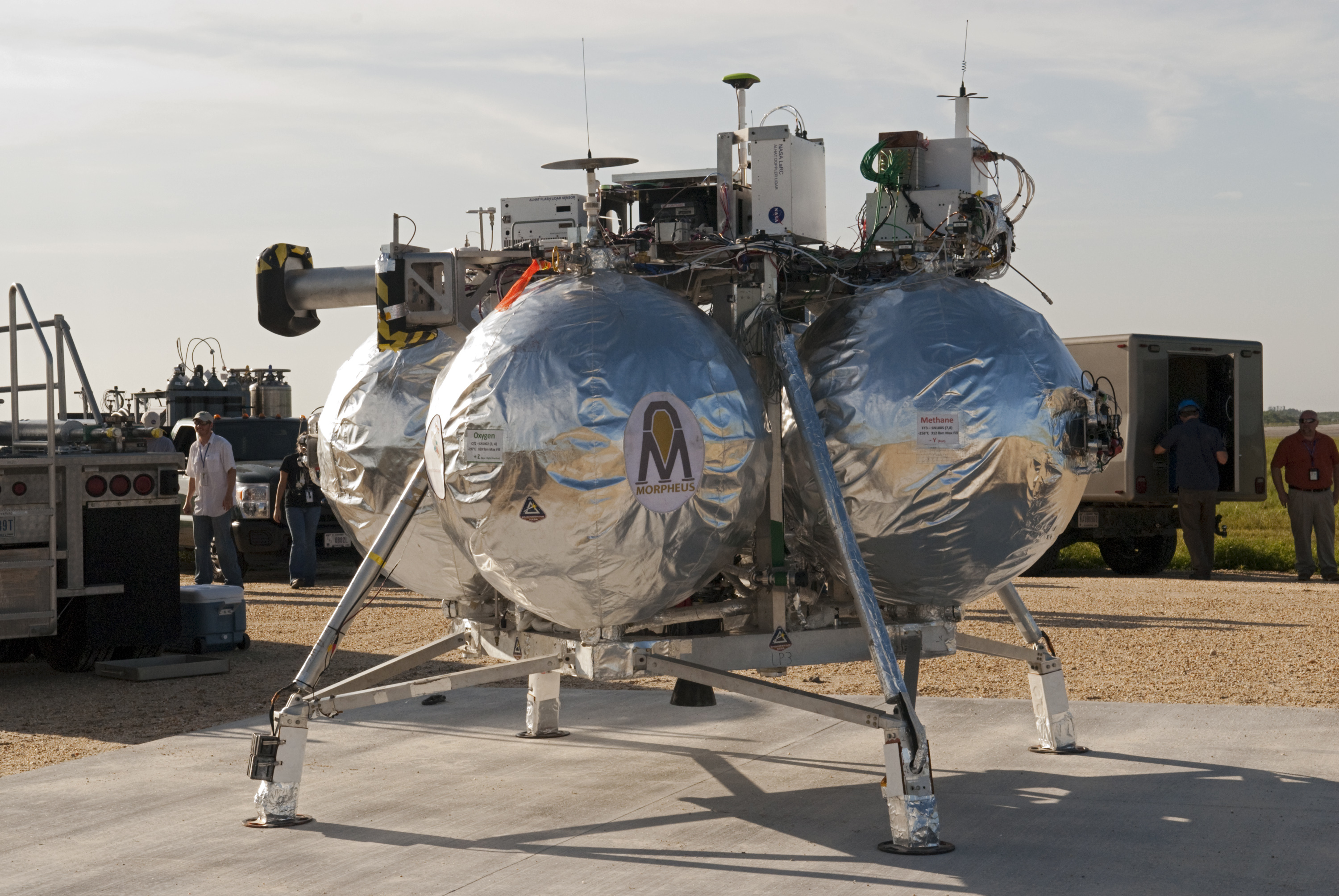
Morpheus Lander in launch position

== History ==
Project Morpheus started in July 2010 and was named after Morpheus, the Greek god of dreams. The Morpheus spacecraft was derived from the experimental lander produced by Project M with the assistance of Armadillo Aerospace. Project M (NASA) was a NASA initiative to design, develop and land a humanoid robot on the lunar surface in 1000 days. Work on some of the lander's systems began in 2006, when NASA's Constellation program planned a human return to the Moon.

In the same year 2006, Armadillo Aerospace entered the first Pixel rocket lander into the Lunar Lander Challenge part of NASA's Centennial Challenges.

The Morpheus #1 Unit A test vehicle was first hot-fired on 15 April 2011.

Morpheus's new 4,200-pound-force (19,000 N) engine permitted NASA to fly longer durations by lifting more propellant into the air. The engine was upgraded again in 2013 to 5,000 lbf (22,000 N) finally reaching 5,400 lbf (24,000 N). A new design of landing gear was part of the Mechanical changes. NASA also replaced the avionics - this included power distribution and storage, instrumentation, the flight computer, communications and software. The enhanced landing system permits Morpheus, unlike the Pixels, to liftoff, fly, and land without help from a pilot.

For Range Safety purposes the Morpheus#1 prototype falls into the category of guided suborbital reusable rocket.

In July 2012 the prototype lander was sent to the Kennedy Space Center for free flight testing and the media invited to view the Morpheus Lander. On August 9, 2012, the prototype Morpheus #1 Unit A (Alpha) lander crashed on takeoff, whilst performing its second untethered flight at Kennedy Space Center. No one was injured and no property was damaged but the vehicle was damaged beyond repair. The project investigated the cause and continued by building unit B. In the second half of 2012 the Project Morpheus and ALHAT teams were combined.

On February 7, 2013, the Project Morpheus team blogged that they have built the Morpheus 1.5B and 1.5C vehicles. The vehicles underwent a series of static hot fire and dynamic tethered flight tests at Johnson Space Center spring 2013 in preparation for a return to free-flight testing at Kennedy Space Center later that year.

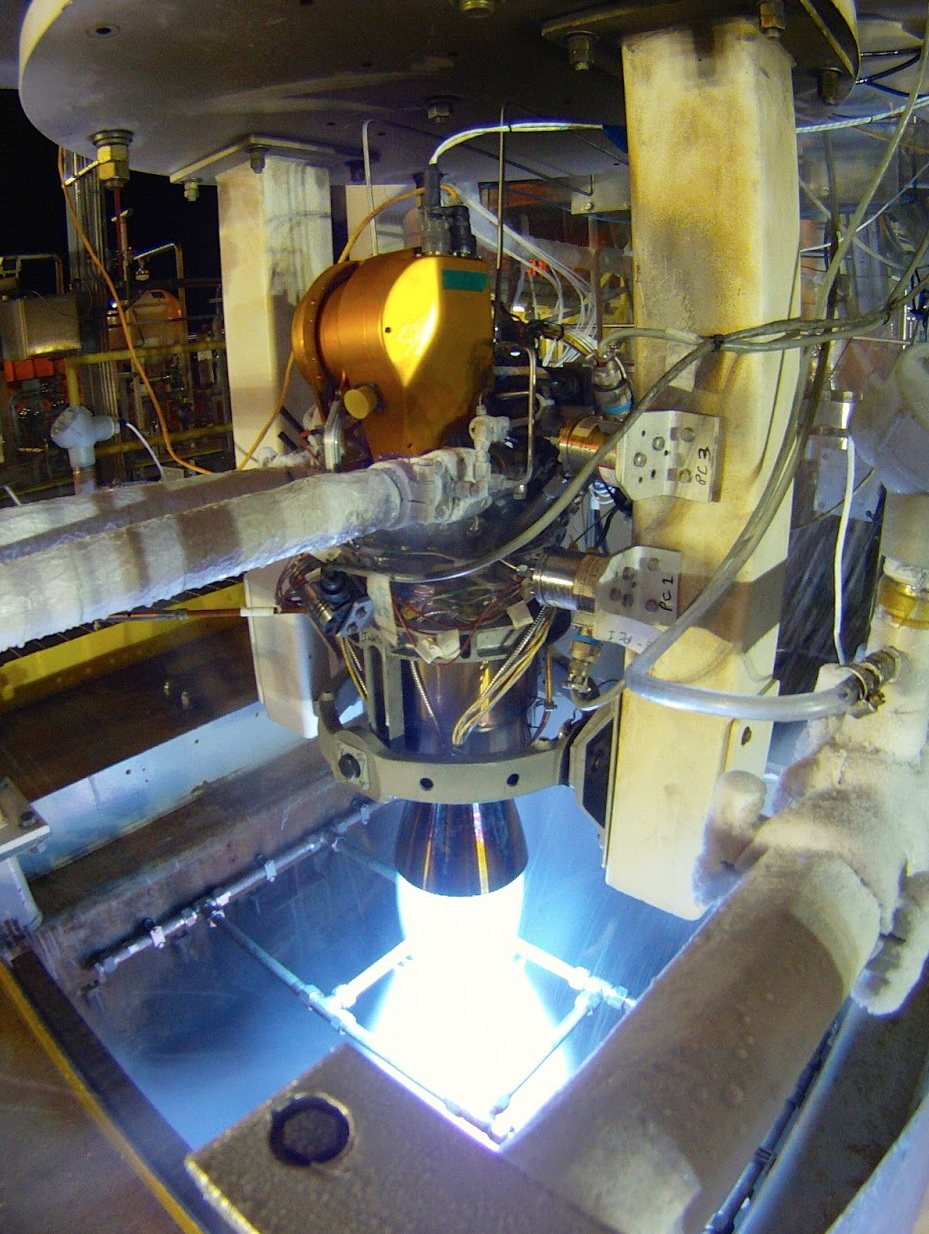
Project Morpheus: Testing of the NASA HD4 main rocket engine at NASA's Stennis Space Center

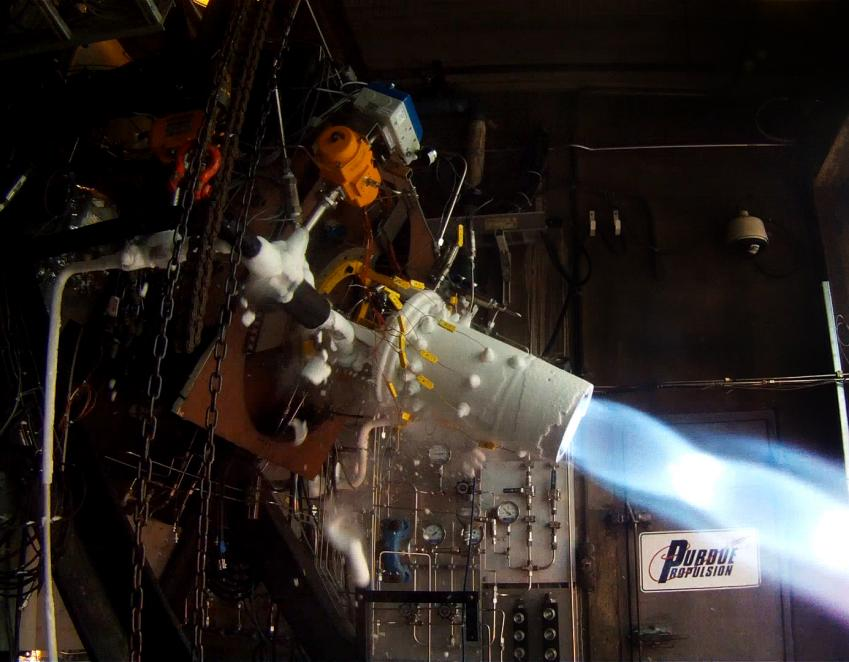
Combustion chamber for Project Morpheus designed by Purdue University students being tested at Purdue's Zucrow Labs

On May 1, 2013, the replacement Morpheus #1.5 Unit B testbed was Hot Fired at the Johnson Space Center. The replacement's enhancements include a 5,400 pounds-force (24,000 N) thrust main engine and integrated oxygen/methane reaction control system (RCS), making it the first oxygen/methane vehicle with Main and RCS engines drawing propellant from the same tanks and first vehicle to use a cryogenic RCS. On June 14, 2013, rapid re-usability was demonstrated by having two flights using the same lander on the same day. In July 2013 the ALHAT equipment was integrated into and tested with the lander. On September 26, 2013, the vehicles performed 20 short engine firings at a variety of conditions whilst fastened to the ground.

In November 2013 the Bravo Lander was taken to Kennedy Space Center (KSC), Florida for free flight testing. $750,000 of parts were purchased to make the replacement lander. KSC limited the noise vibrations on the lander as it lifts off by designing a mobile launch pad with a built-in flame trench.

Free Flight 9 on March 11, 2014, was the final flight before integration of ALHAT sensors on Bravo vehicle. Free Flight 14 on May 28, 2014, was performed at night with the ALHAT acting as the prime guidance system. The hazards in the hazard field were automatically avoided.

In May 2014 Project Morpheus formed part of the reference material for NASA's Lunar CATALYST initiative.

A paper was published in 2013 revealing the lessons learnt during the development, which may be useful to future projects. In 2014 a paper describing the integrated test campaign, including the free flights, was published.

An article giving a short history of the project was printed in RocketSTEM on July 11, 2014.

In November 2014, the Morpheus Lander was fitted with additional ALHAT sensors. The new optics permit the Navigation Doppler Lidar to accurately measure the vehicle's velocity relative to the ground.

== Objectives ==
The primary objectives of the Morpheus project were to demonstrate:

- the integrated system performance of the autonomous Guidance, Navigation and Control (GN&C) system,
- terrain hazard avoidance sensors,
- the coupling of the sensors with the GN&C,
- the utilization of an integrated Main/RCS engine liquid oxygen and liquid methane propulsion system.^{[Note a]}

Specifically, the Morpheus project and the Autonomous Landing Hazard Avoidance Technology (ALHAT) project provide technological foundations for key components necessary to transport humans beyond low Earth orbit.

The testbed can optionally be fitted with up to 1000 lb cargo, allowing fitting of the 400lb Autonomous Landing Hazard Avoidance Technology (ALHAT) equipment, which permits landings without operator interaction. ALHAT permits the lander to fly to a specified location with high accuracy and to automatically avoid hazards including slopes greater than 5 degrees and boulders taller than 30 cm.

In June 2013 the team remarked on the potential to scale the 500 kg payload lander up to one able to land a habitable module with a crew on places such as the Moon.

== Hardware specifications ==
Morpheus Lander
Description	Size	Ref
Payload	500 kg	
Dry mass	~1100 kg	
Propellant	methane/LOX	
Propellant mass	2900 kg	
Propellant tanks	4 off	
Pressurization	helium	
Height	3.7 m	
Diameter	3.7 m	
Main Engine	HD5	
Primary RCS propellant	methane/LOX	
RCS thrust	22–67 N	
Backup RCS propellant	helium (He)	
Optional hardware	ALHAT	
Class of lasers in ALHAT	IV	

Morpheus Engine (HD5)
Description	Size	Ref
Thrust	24000 N	
Specific Impulse	321 s	
Maximum burn (tested)	123 s	
Propellant	methane/LOX	
Throttle range	4:1	
Fuel mixture ratio	(TBD)	-
Nozzle ratio	(TBD)	-
Air startable	yes	
Engine restartable	yes	
Maximum service life	(TBD)	-
Weight	(TBD)	-
Chamber pressure	(TBD)	-
Manufacture	NASA JSC	
Minimum ground to nozzle during ignition	~15 feet	
Manufacturing cost per engine (2013)	$60,000	

The Project Morpheus vehicle 'Morpheus' is a full scale vehicle that NASA intends to be capable of landing Robonaut or a similar sized payload on the lunar surface. The spacecraft will perform all propellant burns after the trans-lunar injection.

Navigation is completely autonomous from Lunar Orbit to touchdown. Navigation updates come from TRN Laser altimetry and star trackers after deorbit burn. Deep space navigation relies on radiometric and star trackers.

To save money and time the prototype Morpheus landers are "single-string" prototypes, this means that unlike a spacecraft rated for actual space flight they do not have redundant systems. The exceptions are stated below.

Morpheus #1.5 Unit A

- Engine burns the environmentally friendly propellants methane and oxygen, pressurized by helium
- The Morpheus HD4 engine produced 4,200 pounds-force (19,000 N) thrust compatible with the Altair ascent stage (Later upgraded for Units B and C, see below)
- The engine has a maximum specific impulse (Isp) during space flight of 321 seconds.
- The pressure-fed cryogenic engine supports 4:1 throttling and uses an impinging element injector design.
- The engine is gimballed by two orthogonal electromechanical actuators (EMAs) to provide thrust vector control of lateral translation, and pitch and yaw attitudes.
- Has four 48 in (1,200 mm) diameter tanks, 2 for liquid methane and 2 for liquid oxygen - able to contain about 2,900 kg (6,400 lb) of propellant
- The approximate dry mass is 2,400 lb (1,100 kg).
- Size about 12 feet x 12 feet x 12 feet (3.7 m x 3.7 m x 3.7 m).
- The Version 1.5 lander, with its HD5 engine, can land 1,100 lb (500 kg), this includes performing all propellant burns after the trans-lunar injection.
- The primary Reaction Control System (RCS) thrusters, used to control the lander's roll, use methane and LOX from the main tanks. Thrust produced is 5–15 pounds-force (22–67 N).
- The backup RCS uses helium (He).
- The Main and RCS engines were designed and built at NASA/JSC and test fired at NASA/JSC, NASA/SSC, and NASA/KSC
- An Aitech S950 CompactPCI board with a PowerPC 750 processor is used as the main computer.
- Up to 16 GB of data can be stored on board.
- Data buses include RS-422, RS-232, Ethernet and MIL-STD-1553.
- In flight the avionics and power unit (APU) are cooled using liquid methane, any resulting vapour is then vented.
- On the ground liquid nitrogen is used for avionics cooling. Before flights the avionics is purged of water using gaseous nitrogen.
- Onboard cameras.
- Telemetry is returned using the spread spectrum wireless communications.
- Electrical power is supplied by 8 lithium polymer batteries.
- GN&C sensor suite including:
  - Javad Global Positioning System (GPS) receiver
  - International Space Station (ISS) version of Honeywell's Space Integrated GPS/INS (SIGI)
  - Litton LN-200 Inertial Measurement Unit (IMU)
  - Acuity laser altimeter.
- Goddard Space Flight Center's (GSFC) Core Flight Software (CFS) provides the architecture for the vehicle's software.
- Each of the 4 legs has a foot pad covered with fire resistant material to soften landings.
- The standalone accelerometer units were built using the Modular Instrumentation System (MIS) designed by Johnson Space Center
- Optional ALHAT hardware. The ALHAT equipment and its mass are considered part of the payload.

Commands can be sent using separate Ultra High Frequency (UHF) radios to the thrust termination system (TTS). Use of the TTS by range safety will close two motorized valves which shut off the flow of liquid oxygen and methane to the engine - thereby terminating engine thrust. These TTS valves are completely independent from the rest of the vehicle systems. The TTS also stops the laser in the ALHAT's Hazard Detection System from firing - since Type IV lasers are not eye safe.

For further details see the "Morpheus: Advancing Technologies for Human Exploration" paper.

Morpheus #1.5 Unit B

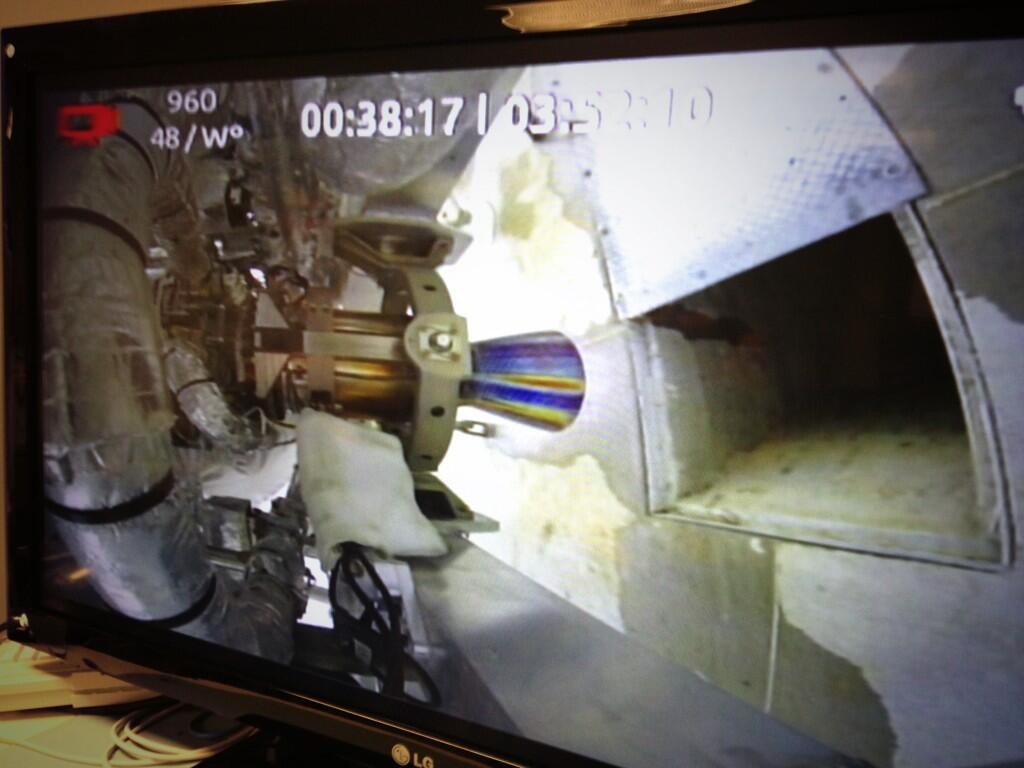
The Morpheus Lander's main engine over the mini Flame Trench at the NASA Johnson Space Center

The prototype Morpheus #1 Unit B lander is using the same design as the prototype Morpheus #1.5 Unit A lander with the following changes:

- Backup systems for the Inertial Measurement Unit were added
- 70 different upgrades to the vehicle and ground systems to both address potential contributors to the test failure, and also to improve operability and maintainability. These include:
  - advanced engine performance capability,
  - enhanced communication protocols,
  - redundant instrumentation where appropriate,
  - increased structural margins,
  - and mitigated launch vibroacoustic environments.
- The upgraded HD4 and HD5 Morpheus engines produce 5,400 pounds-force (24,000 N) thrust.
- The project estimates that the new engine could lift the ascent stage of a crewed lander containing 3-4 people to lunar orbit
- The connectors were replaced by military-specification versions.
- Rapid reuseability, permitting multiple flights in a day.
- The Lander can handle winds of about 10 miles per hour (16 km/h).
- To reduce vibroacoustic launch problems during tether testing, the lander was lifted 15 feet (4.6 m) above the ground and a lightweight cord that melts was used to hold down the lander.
- Unit B is also called the Bravo vehicle.

Morpheus #1.5 Unit C

The prototype Morpheus #1 Unit C lander is using the same design as the prototype Morpheus #1.5 Unit A lander with the following changes:

- Enhancements as Unit B above. This vehicle was never flown.

=== Autonomous Landing Hazard Avoidance Technology ===
The optional Autonomous Landing Hazard Avoidance Technology (ALHAT) equipment permits landings without operator interaction. ALHAT permits the lander to fly to a specified location with high accuracy and to automatically avoid hazards, including slopes greater than 5 degrees and boulders taller than 30 cm. The active sensors include a flash LIDAR, a lidar Doppler velocimeter and a laser altimeter.

== Software ==
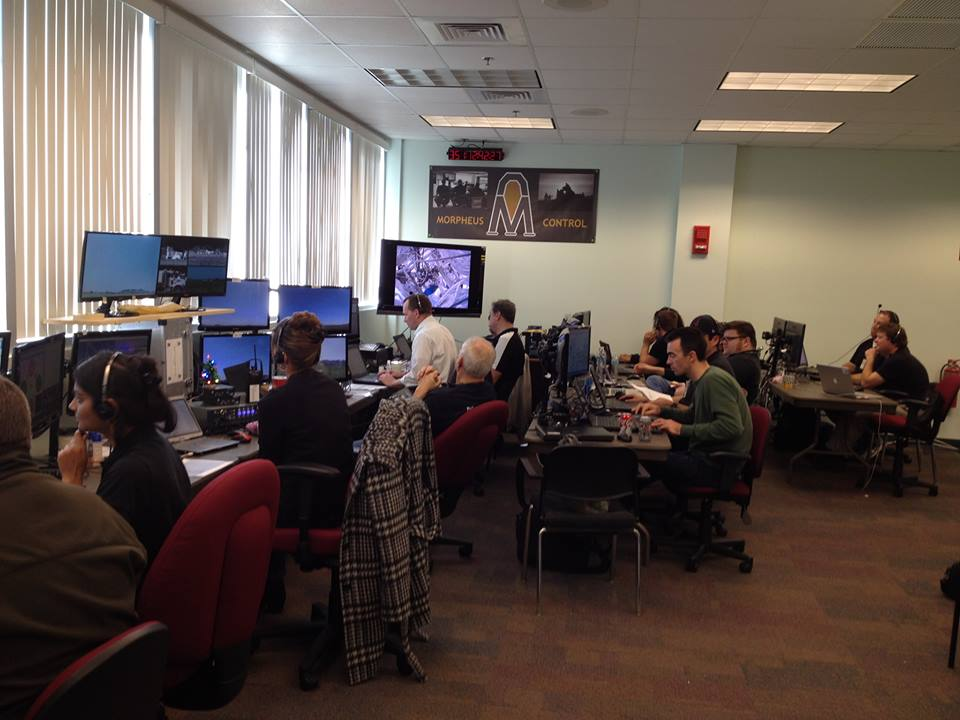
The Morpheus Control Room preparing to launch the Lander

Project Morpheus lean development philosophy resulted in a mix of new and previously existing software being used. Software is used in:

- the vertical test bed (lander). The NASA-Goddard-Space-Flight-Center-developed Core Flight Software (CFS) has been enhanced with specific applications software and custom sensor and I/O applications.
- hardware development. Including using the OVERFLOW package (and wind tunnel tests).
- the ground environment, including mission control. Mission Control Technologies has been used to display propellant tank pressures and other parameters during test firing.
- the ALHAT system.
- flight simulation, both offline and connected to flight hardware. Packages used include JSC Trick Simulation Environment, the JSC Engineering Orbital Dynamics (JEOD) package and the JSC generic models Valkyrie package. The parameters have been tuned to reflect the Morpheus flight hardware such as actuators and data obtained from the tethered test flights.
- the Microsoft SharePoint package was used by the engineers and managers to plan, share documents and to provide a method of configuration change control.
- documents were frequently written using Microsoft Office.

== Test bed tests ==
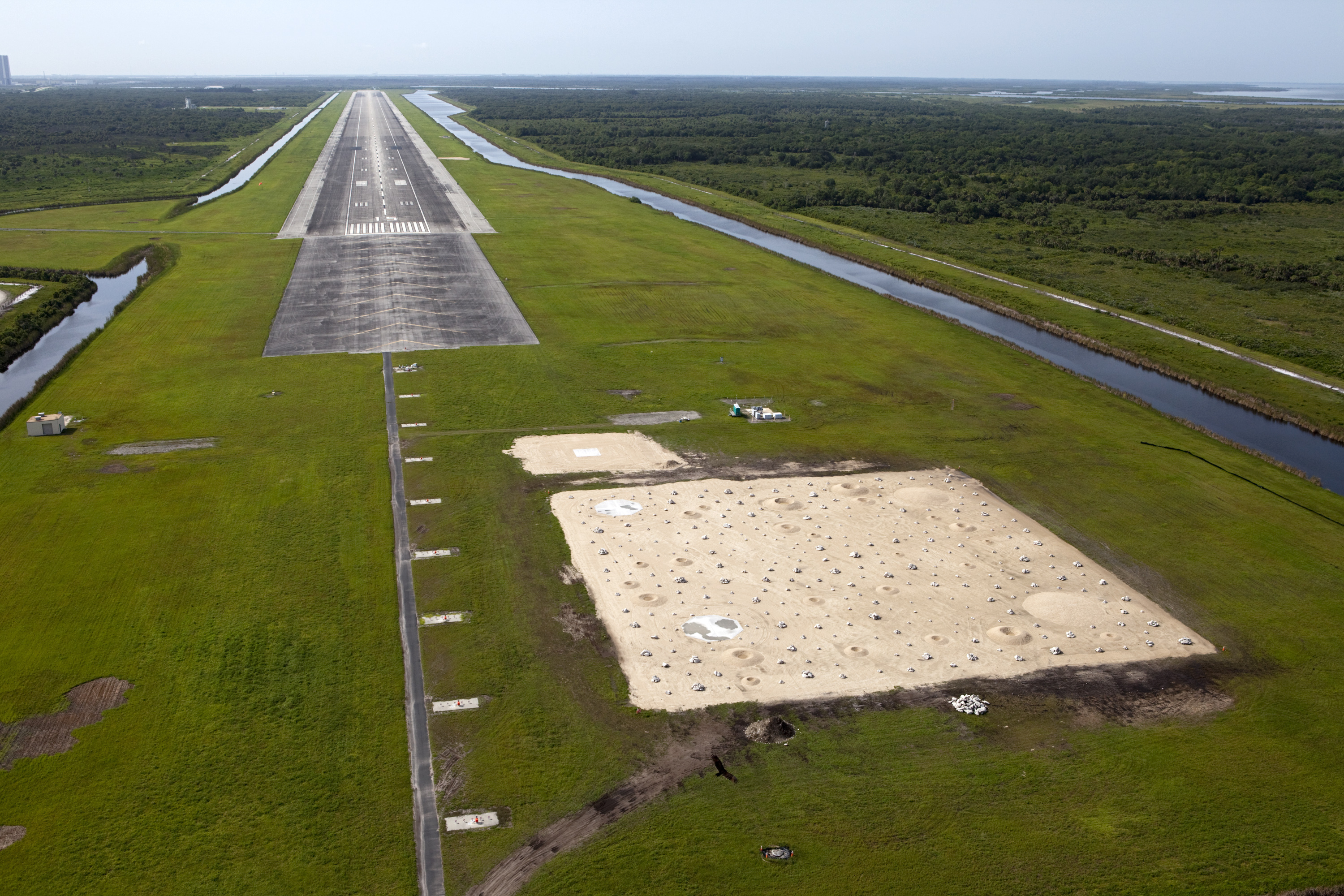
Hazard field at the end of the Shuttle runway KSC

2011

As of April 2011 the primary focus of the test bed is to demonstrate an integrated propulsion and inertial-based guidance, navigation, and control (GN&C) systems that can fly a lunar descent profile, thereby exercising the Autonomous Landing and Hazard Avoidance Technology (ALHAT), safe landing sensors and closed-loop flight control system.

Additional objectives include technology demonstrations such as tank material and manufacture, reaction control thrusters, main engine performance improvements, Helium pressurization systems, ground operations, flight operations, range safety, software and avionics architecture.

The Vertical Test Bed (VTB) Flight Complex at JSC has been successfully using the Mission Control Technologies (MCT) software written at NASA Ames to control the test flights of the Morpheus lander. Parameters displayed include propellant tank pressures.

A set of integrated vehicle test flights including hot-fire, tethered hover tests and untethered "free-flights" were devised for the Morpheus vehicle.

To provide clearance for the vehicle's exhaust plume during hot-fire tests the lander was tethered 20 feet (6.1 m) above the ground. A height of 15 feet (4.6 m) was used for the tethered testing.

The testing, test results and equipment modifications performed during 2011, up to and including Tethered Test 6, were published in the conference proceeding of the 2012 IEEE Aerospace Conference at Big Sky, MT

2012

Videos of the test flights have been posted on the Morpheus Lander Channel on YouTube. This includes the 2012 regression test flights with the more powerful V1.5 engine whilst the lander is tethered, and the problematic early test flight that shows "This is why we test".

On May 10, 2012, the testbed passed its hover and soft abort tests, shown in video "Morpheus Tether Test 15". The lander was returned to the workshop to have the ALHAT equipment fitted. The Reaction Control System (RCS) thrusters were also fitted.

During the Summer 2012, the Morpheus Lander V1.5 Unit A was transferred to the Kennedy Space Center in Florida for an untethered flight testing. Also, a "hazard field" was built containing hazards such as rocks and craters built at the end of the Space Shuttle's runway to test that the ALHAT system can automatically navigate to a clear landing site. As can be seen in the photograph, the Kennedy's wide open spaces permit the entire flight path including runway and hazard field to be surrounded by a fire break consisting of a moat filled with water.

The 330 by 330 ft (100 by 100 m) hazard field included five potential landing pads, 311 piles of rocks and 24 craters that mimic an area on the Moon's south pole.

On July 20, 2012, the 43rd anniversary of the Apollo 11 lunar landing, the Morpheus test vehicle arrived at Kennedy Space Center (KSC) for advanced testing. The high performance HD5 version of the Morpheus engine was performance tested at the Stennis Space Center in the summer of 2012. The testing and building of the hazard field were paid for by NASA's Advanced Exploration Systems Program (AES).

2013

During Autumn 2012 and early 2013 a fourth and a fifth generation Morpheus methane/LOX rocket engine were test fired at Stennis Space Center. A successful long duration burn lasted 123 seconds. Other tests verified capabilities and throttle levels.

The ALHAT equipment was tested using a helicopter on the KSC hazard field. Multiple flights were made using Morpheus-like trajectories, which had to take wind direction into account.

Fuel tanks for the lander were put through a series of inspections and tests, including checking welds for defects and cycling tank pressure to establish a minimum cycle life expectancy of the tanks. The maximum pressure capability was verified by pressurizing a sacrificial tank until it burst.

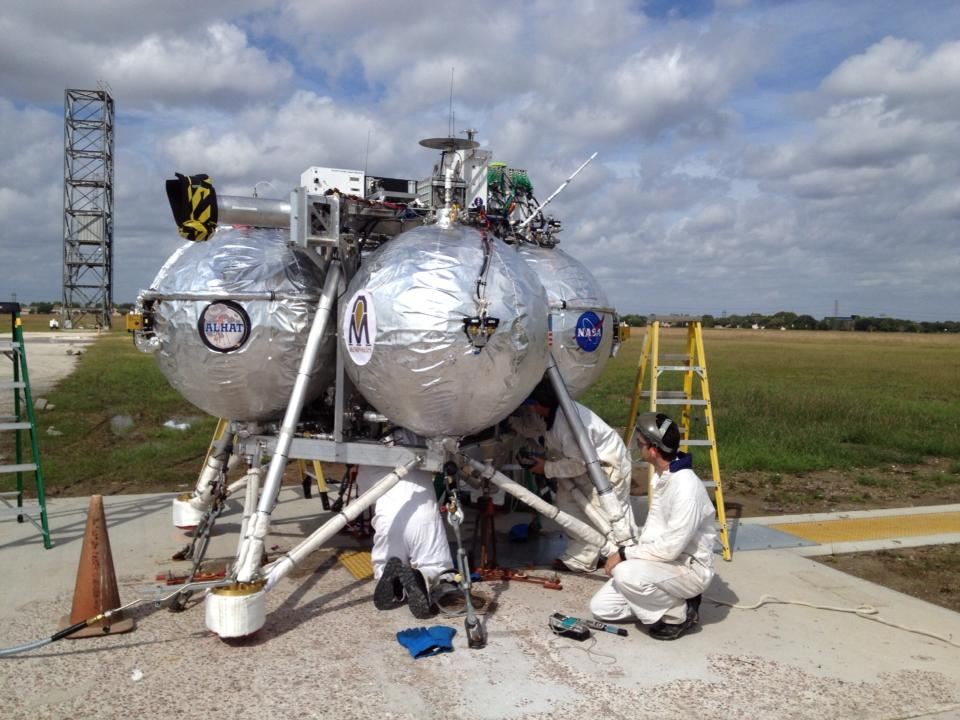
The Morpheus team prepares the Bravo Lander for a test flight.

On May 1, 2013, at JSC the replacement Unit B Morpheus testbed was fired for 50 seconds whilst fully tethered. The integrated methane reaction control system (RCS) and thrust vector control (TVC) jets were also fired. Many enhancements had been incorporated into the vehicle and ground systems.

On May 16, 2013, at JSC the testbed was fired whilst fastened to the ground, and later tethered 3 ft (0.91 m) above the ground, followed by some reaction control system tests. A small leak was repaired, allowing the testing of the effects of vibration to be nominal. In preparation for the tests, the fire break around the test area had been paved and a mini "flame trench" dug.

On May 24, 2013, at JSC the V1.5B testbed was high tethered. There was a good ignition and climb. A soft abort terminated the flight when the vehicle exceeded an internally set boundary limit whilst attempting to stabilize itself.

On June 6, 2013, at JSC in Tethered Test 22 a tethered testbed successfully flew for 74 seconds. The hover lasted 60 seconds and was smooth. Used the primary IMU.

On June 11, 2013, in a tethered test at JSC the backup Inertial Measurement Unit (IMU) passed its flight test. The flight lasted 27 seconds including 17 seconds hovering.

On June 14, 2013, two tethered flights were performed. The first firing was soft aborted when the vehicle exceed its safety zone due to an imbalance in the fuel load. The 2nd firing was successful. This counts as a restarting of the engine. During the second flight, the vehicle successfully switched from using its primary Inertial Measurement Unit (IMU) to the secondary IMU.

On July 2, 2013, integration tests were performed with an ALHAT attached to the Morpheus Lander. These tests included "tilt" tests where the lander's legs were raised on different heights of blocks so the attitude is off vertical.

On July 11, 2013, the first tethered flight test of Morpheus vehicle "Bravo" with Autonomous Landing & Hazard Avoidance Technology (ALHAT) laser sensors integrated on top was performed. On the second attempt there was a good ignition, but during ascent the vehicle translated downrange and exceeded the internally set range safety boundary limit (+/−4 m) for tether tests, triggering an automatic soft abort.

On July 23, 2013, Tethered Test 26 was successfully performed. The lander and ALHAT flew to and hovered at two different heights. Both the primary RCS (methane/LOX) and the backup RCS (He) were used, producing a successful 'landing' at the end of the tether. Lateral excursion was a maximum of only ~0.2 m. The ALHAT's tracking and imaging were nominal, managing to identify the hazard target.

On July 27, 2013, the combined Morpheus/ALHAT Tethered Test 27 worked. The lander took off, performed ALHAT imaging and then a lateral translation.

On August 7, 2013, Tethered Test 28 was successfully performed. In a flight lasting ~80 seconds the vehicle executed an engine ignition, ascent, a 3-meter lateral translation over simulated Mars soil, 40 seconds of hover at the apex, and a slant descent to "landing" using free flight guidance. The Mars simulated soil was provided by Jet Propulsion Laboratory (JPL) as part of a plume study.

On August 23, 2013, Bravo lander successfully performed Tethered Test 29 at JSC. During the ~50 second flight Bravo's actions included ignition, ascent and a 3-meter lateral translation. There was a 10 seconds hover at the apex, and a slant descent to the crane "landing" using free flight guidance.

On August 29, 2013, Bravo lander successfully performed the ~63 second Tethered Test 30 flight at JSC. After an ascent of 5 meters with 15 seconds of hover at the apex, a 3-meter backwards lateral translation was performed. Followed by another 15 seconds of hover, and a forward slant descent.

On September 18, 2013, in strong winds, the Bravo lander successfully performed Tether Test 31. This flight was a quick turnaround after the previous day's testing had been scrubbed. Various problems were solved by the team.

On September 24, 2013, the Lander was launched from the ground. Several problems were detected resulting in an abort. The problems included a false "engine nozzle burn-through" alert and engine startup instability. On September 26, 2013, test HF10 was performed. This involved 20 short firings of the engine on the same day at a variety of pressures, temperatures and power levels. The investigation aimed to probe the instability boundaries of the engine during startup.

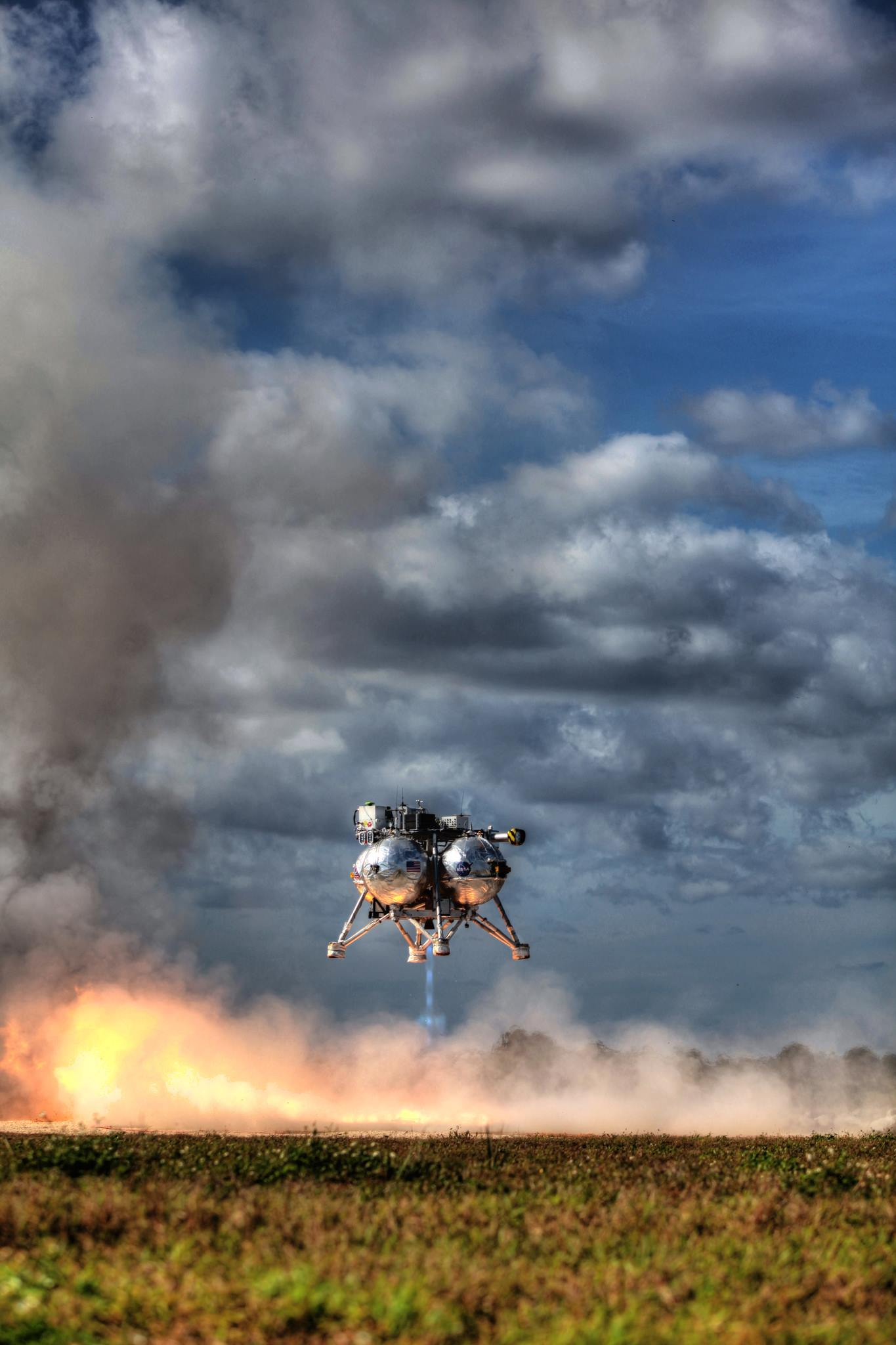
The first successful free flight of the Project Morpheus lander. The flight took place at Kennedy Space Center on Tuesday December 10, 2013

On October 29, 2013, the lander and its rocket engine methane/LOX performed six off 600 ms burns whilst on top of the trench at JSC. There were no instabilities. On November 1, 2013, with all the software and hardware enhancements included, the lander successfully performed a tethered flight test. The vehicle performed an air start whilst being supported by the tether. On November 7, 2013, the project completed testing the lander at JSC with a Ground Test Takeoff and Landing (GTAL). The vehicle flew nominally and landed within 1 in (2.5 cm) cross range and 6 in (15 cm) downrange of its intended target. The GTAL test characterized the performance of the vehicle in lifting off from launch stands on the ground, flying to a height of 21 ft (6.4 m), hover and descent profile, and landing back on the ground at a separate pad 10 ft (3.0 m) from its launch point. This suggests that the faults revealed by Incident 2 below on August 9, 2012, have now been found and fixed.

On December 6, 2013, the integrated vehicle passed Tether Test 33 at Kennedy Space Center in Florida. This was a repeat of Tethered Test 29. The test was primary performed to verify that the Bravo lander was OK after being transported from Texas. On December 10, 2013, the first free flight of a Morpheus prototype lander was successfully conducted at Kennedy Space Center's Shuttle Landing Facility. The 54-second test began with the Morpheus lander launching from the ground over a flame trench and ascending approximately 50 feet, then hovering for about 15 seconds. The lander then flew forward and landed on its pad about 23 feet from the launch point and about 6 inches from the target point.

On December 17, 2013, the Morpheus Lander successfully performed Free Flight 4. The preplanned trajectory was flown flawlessly, landing within 3.5 inches of its intended target. Morpheus ascended from the ground over the flame trench to an altitude of about 164 feet (50 m), after pausing briefly at 82 feet (25 m) to maintain the target ascent velocities. The vehicle then flew forward, covering about 154 feet (47 m) in 30 seconds, before descending and landing on a dedicated landing pad inside the ALHAT hazard field.

2014

On January 16, 2014, Free Flight 5 was successfully performed at the KSC Shuttle Landing Facility. The Bravo vehicle flew higher and faster than in all of its previous flights. The preplanned trajectory involved ascending quickly to 57 m (187 ft), traversing 47 m (154 ft) while descending, then landing approximately 11 inches from intended target in the Hazard Field about a minute after launch. On January 21, 2014, Bravo performed Free Flight 6. In a flight lasting 64 seconds the vehicle ascended to 305 ft (93 m) and then flew forward 358 ft (109 m) in 25 seconds. As planned, Bravo landed in the Hazard Field, 0.38 m (15 inches) from the target. The maximum ascent velocity was 11.4 m/s (25.5 mph).

On February 10, 2014, Free Flight 7 was flown at KSC. Bravo flew to 467 feet (142 m) altitude and then traversed 637 feet (194 m) in 30 seconds before landing in the hazard field. The vehicle flew its pre-planned trajectory flawlessly, reaching a maximum ascent velocity of 13 m/s, and landing an on its intended target 74 seconds after launch. The engineers state the altitude during tests is not the important part, but the flight experience gained, including all phases of the check-out, ground loading, flight, and recovery operations.

On February 14, 2014, and March 3, 2014, hot fire testing of the lander's Roll Control System (RCS) using a variety of short and long pulses was performed at KSC. The multi-center Morpheus Team successfully completed Free Flight 8 at the Kennedy Space Center (KSC) Shuttle Landing Facility (SLF) on Wednesday, March 5, 2014. Bravo vehicle flew to an altitude of 467 ft (142 m) and then traversed 637 ft (194 m) in 36 seconds, including diverting course mid-flight, before landing in the hazard field 56 ft (17 m) from its original target (simulating hazard avoidance). The vehicle reached a maximum ascent velocity of 13 m/s, and landed approximately 10 inches from its intended target 79 seconds after launch.

On Tuesday, March 11, 2014, the Morpheus team successfully completed Free Flight 9 (FF9) at the KSC SLF. This was Morpheus' highest (177 m (581 ft), higher than the VAB & Washington Monument), fastest (13.4 m/s (30 mph) vertical & horizontal) and farthest (255 m (837 ft)) flight to date.

During the rest of March 2014 the ALHAT hardware was inserted again permitting a successful tethered test of the assembly on March 27, 2014. Tether Test 34 flight trajectory was similar to TT33 and TT29 with two hovers and a 3 m (9.8 ft) translation during a 3.25 m (10.7 ft) ascent. Free Flight 10 (FF10) took place on April 2, 2014, with the ALHAT in open loop mode. The ALHAT imaged the Hazard Field and calculating navigation solutions in real time. Morpheus ascended to a maximum altitude of about 804 feet (245 m), then flew forward and downward initially at a 30-degree glideslope, then levelling out, covering a total of about 1334 feet (406.5 m) horizontally in 50 seconds while diverting to a landing site location 78 feet (23.8 m) from its initial target, before descending and landing on a dedicated landing pad at the front (south) of the ALHAT Hazard Field. The total flight time was ~96 sec, the longest flight to date. Free Flight 11 on April 24, 2014, was a repeat of Free Flight 10 with some changes to the ALHAT. April 30, 2014 Free Flight 12 was a repeat of FF10 but with the ALHAT choosing the landing location.

On May 22. 2014 in Free Flight the ALHAT determined a safe location in the hazard field the landing location and flew the lander to it.

The Morpheus/ALHAT team successfully completed Free Flight 14 (FF14) at the KSC SLF on Wednesday, May 28, 2014, Bravo's 12th and ALHAT's 5th free flight—and the first ever night flight. Initial data indicated nominal performance of all vehicle systems. The ALHAT Hazard Detection System (HDS) performed well, but identified a safe site just 0.5 m (1.6 ft) outside the conservatively established limits around the center of the landing pad. ALHAT then navigated the vehicle in closed-loop mode through the entire approach, with the vehicle taking over navigation during the descent phase of the trajectory when ALHAT was already dead-reckoning. Had less conservative position error limits allowed ALHAT to continue to navigate to landing, the vehicle still would have landed safely on the pad.

The team overcame a few preflight issues, including a failed ignition due to a non-critical temperature exceeding its limit, which was corrected for the successful second attempt.

On November 19, 2014, tested the Morpheus Lander at KSC. The ALHAT hardware had been enhanced with new optics that permit the Navigation Doppler Lidar to accurately measure the vehicle's velocity relative to the ground. The test was aborted due to a fault in the remote control system. So far the engine has burnt for a total of 1,134 seconds. Tether Test 36 (TT36) at the KSC SLF on Tuesday December 2, 2014 was a regression test. The Bravo vehicle followed its planned 40 sec trajectory flawlessly, although a handful of discrepancies were identified. The data was reviewed to assess these anomalies and ensure the vehicle and ground systems were ready to support a free flight test.

On December 15, 2014, the prototype lander soared 800 feet above the north end of the Shuttle Landing Facility at Kennedy Space Center in Florida on free flight test No. 15. During the 97-second test, ALHAT, surveyed the hazard field for safe landing sites, then guided the lander forward and downward to a successful landing.

Conclusion

In February 2015, planned testing had been completed. The lander was taken back to JSC. The project review, including testing, was held on March 12, 2015.

== Test equipment and ground operations ==
In addition to the normal engineering tools several items of test equipment was made or procured. These include cranes wrapped in shielding against heat and debris, a tether, a bungee to control the tether and an energy absorber. The energy absorber was a metal tube filled with a fire proof aluminium honeycomb.

Concrete launch and landing pads were built. At Kennedy Space Center a small flame trench for ground launches was dug near the hazard field (constructed to test the ALHAT). Cameras and recording equipment were installed. Computers and radio communications equipment used.

Trolleys to move the lander, batteries and consumables were used. Safety clothing and eye protection against Category IV LASERS were issued.

On a typical test day the ground operations staff work about 10 hours from roll-out until Morpheus is back in the hangar. The different portions of the day are Safety Brief & Vehicle Rollout, Pre-Fill Checkout, Propellant Load (Liquid Oxygen and Liquid Methane), Leak Check, Final Preparation, Flight, and Post Test. Activities are divided between the Pad Crew and the Control Center. As well as the lander electrical batteries for ground power, cranes, load cells and propellant tankers need rolling out to the launch stands.

== Collaborations ==
NASA's Johnson Space Center collaborated with several firms, academic installations and other NASA centers whilst building and testing the Alpha and Bravo prototype Morpheus landers.

For Morpheus and ALHAT, JSC has partnerships with Kennedy Space Center (KSC) for flight-testing; Stennis Space Center (SSC) for engine testing; Marshall Space Flight Center (MSFC) for engine development and lander expertise; Goddard Space Flight Center (GSFC) for core flight software development; and Langley Research Center (LaRC) and the Jet Propulsion Laboratory (JPL) for ALHAT development. Commercial partnerships with enterprises such as Jacobs Engineering, Armadillo Aerospace, Draper Labs, and others have augmented the development and operation of many aspects of the project."

Purdue University's Zucrow Labs assisted in the design of an early Morpheus engine. Tests were conducted at Zucrow Labs in West Lafayette, Indiana in 2014 including multiple successful hotfires of the engine. This work was done under the guidance of Dr. William Anderson and multiple masters and PhD students.

== Health and safety issues ==
Although the liquid oxygen/liquid methane bipropellant mix is considerably easier and safer to handle than hydrazine, the propellants can catch fire and cryogenic fuel tanks and Dewars can explode.

== Incidents ==
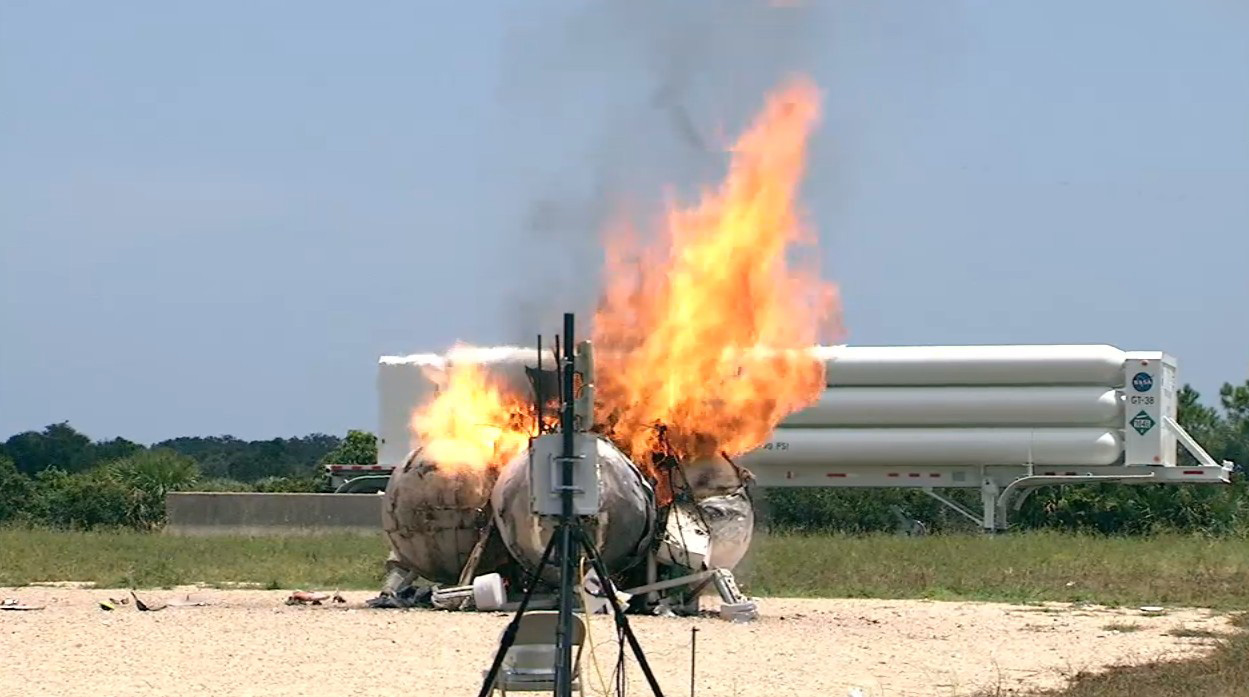
Morpheus lander crash on August 9, 2012

1. On June 1, 2011, a test of the Morpheus lander caused a large grass fire on the grounds of the Johnson Space Center. A minor incident: no one was injured and the Lander was fine. Subsequently, a 10 ft (3.0 m) wide fire break was dug around the test area to prevent the spread of any possible grass fires.
2. On August 9, 2012, the lander tipped over, crashed, caught fire, and exploded twice during its initial free-flight test at the Kennedy Space Center. The fire was extinguished after the tanks had exploded. No one was injured but the vehicle was not in a recoverable condition. Following the accident about 70 different upgrades to the vehicle design and ground systems were made including adding some redundant instrumentation and mitigating the launch vibroacoustic environment. Military-grade cable connectors and bus couplers have been fitted to the replacement vehicles as well as creating a flame trench on the launch-pad to reduce vibration. A paper acting as an investigation report was published at the American Institute of Aeronautics and Astronautics: SPACE 2013 conference.

== Status ==
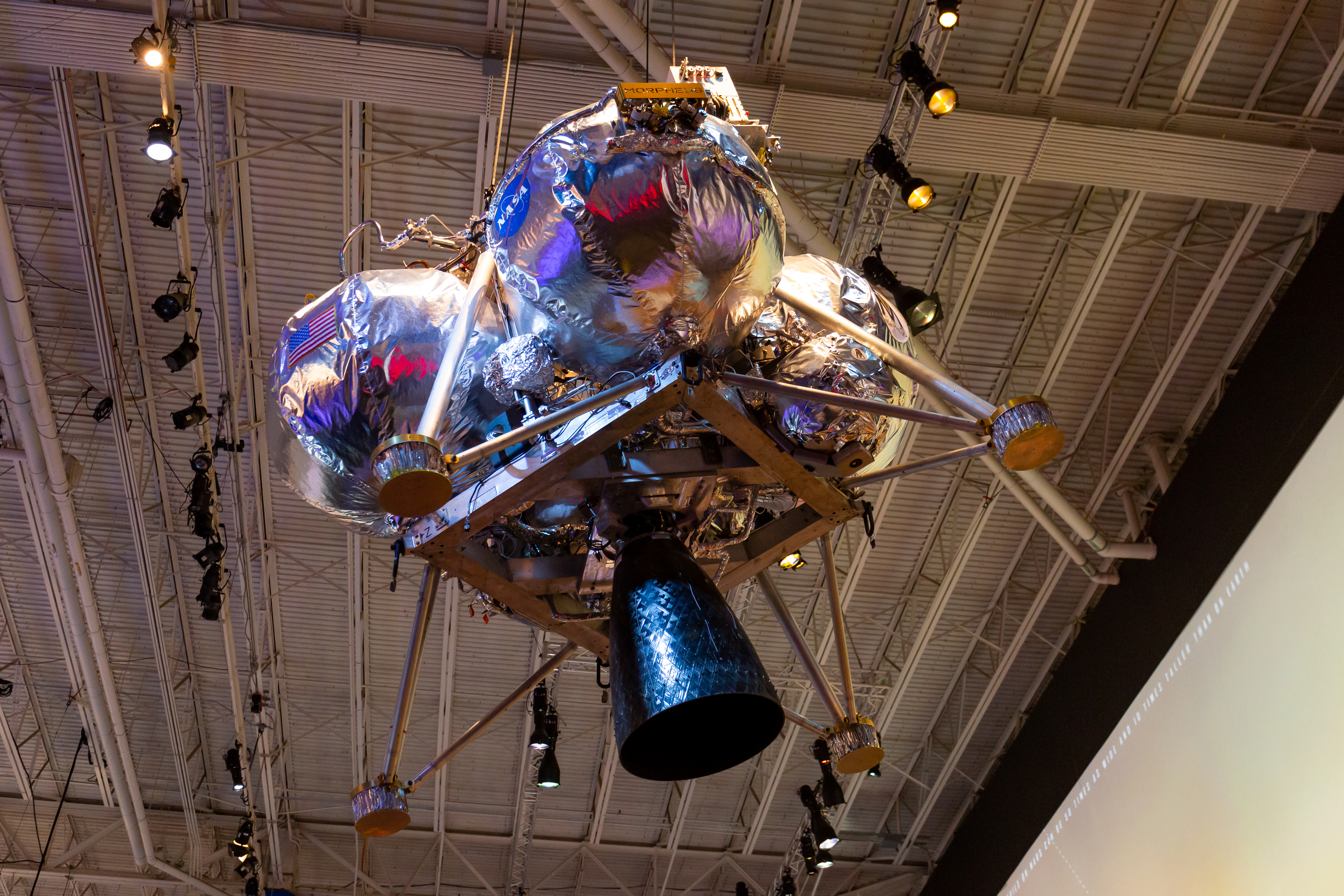
The Morpheus lander at the Johnson Space Center

The Morpheus prototype liquid oxygen and methane (LOx/Methane) propulsion system demonstrated advantages in performance, simplicity, reliability, and reusability. LOx/Methane provides new capabilities to use propellants that are manufactured on the Mars surface for ascent return and to integrate with power and life support systems. It was determined that Lox/Methane is extensible to human spacecraft for many transportation elements of a Mars architecture. The propellants provide significant advantages for reliable ignition in a space vacuum, and for reliable safing or purging of spacecraft. "Through this test, NASA obtained Level 6 of Technology Readiness Level (TRL) related to the planet landing technology"

The Morpheus lander flight demonstrations led to the proposal to use LOx/Methane for a Discovery Program mission, named Moon Aging Regolith Experiment (MARE) to land a science payload for the Southwest Research Institute on the lunar surface. This mission's lander is called NAVIS (NASA Autonomous Vehicle for In-situ Science).

The technology developed is also being applied to the Nova-C lunar lander, which landed on the moon on February 22, 2024.

== See also ==
- Green Propellant Infusion Mission
- Lunar CATALYST
- Mighty Eagle
- Nova-C
- Quad (rocket)
- Raptor (rocket engine family)
- VTVL

== Notes ==
a. Methane is an environmentally friendly (i.e. non-toxic) propellant that NASA hopes will reduce transportation costs by being made in-situ (ISRU). For instance, the Sabatier reaction could be used to convert carbon dioxide (CO_{2}) found on Mars' atmosphere into methane, using either Hydrogen found or transported Hydrogen from Earth, a catalyst, and a source of heat. Hydrogen can be made from water ice, which occurs on both the Earth's Moon and Mars.
