= Space Integrated GPS/INS =

Space Integrated GPS/INS (SIGI) is a strapdown Inertial Navigation Unit (INU) developed and built by Honeywell International to control and stabilize spacecraft during flight.

SIGI has integrated global positioning and inertial navigation technology to provide three navigation solutions : Pure inertial, GPS-only and blended GPS/INS.

== Current and Future Usage ==
SIGI have been employed on the International Space Station, the Japanese H-II Transfer Vehicle (HTV) the Boeing X-37, CST-100 Starliner and X-40.

SIGI is also being used in Orion for Artemis missions III, IV, and V.

== See also ==
- Air navigation
- Spherical trigonometry
- Miniature Inertial Measurement Unit (MIMU)
