= Project M (NASA) =

Proposed unmanned NASA lunar mission

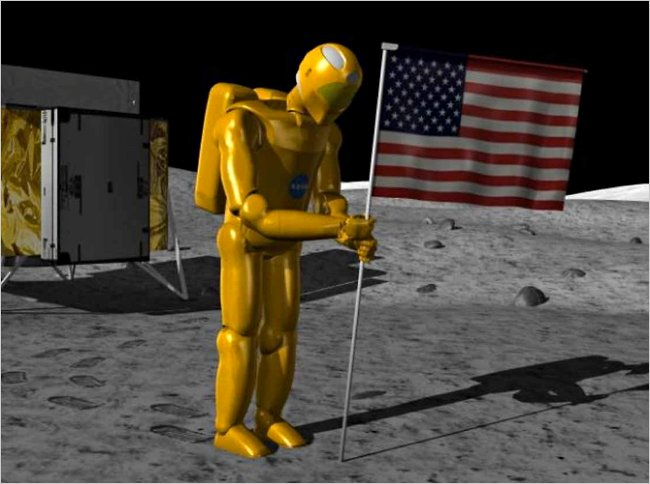
Simulation of Robonaut 2 on moon for Project M

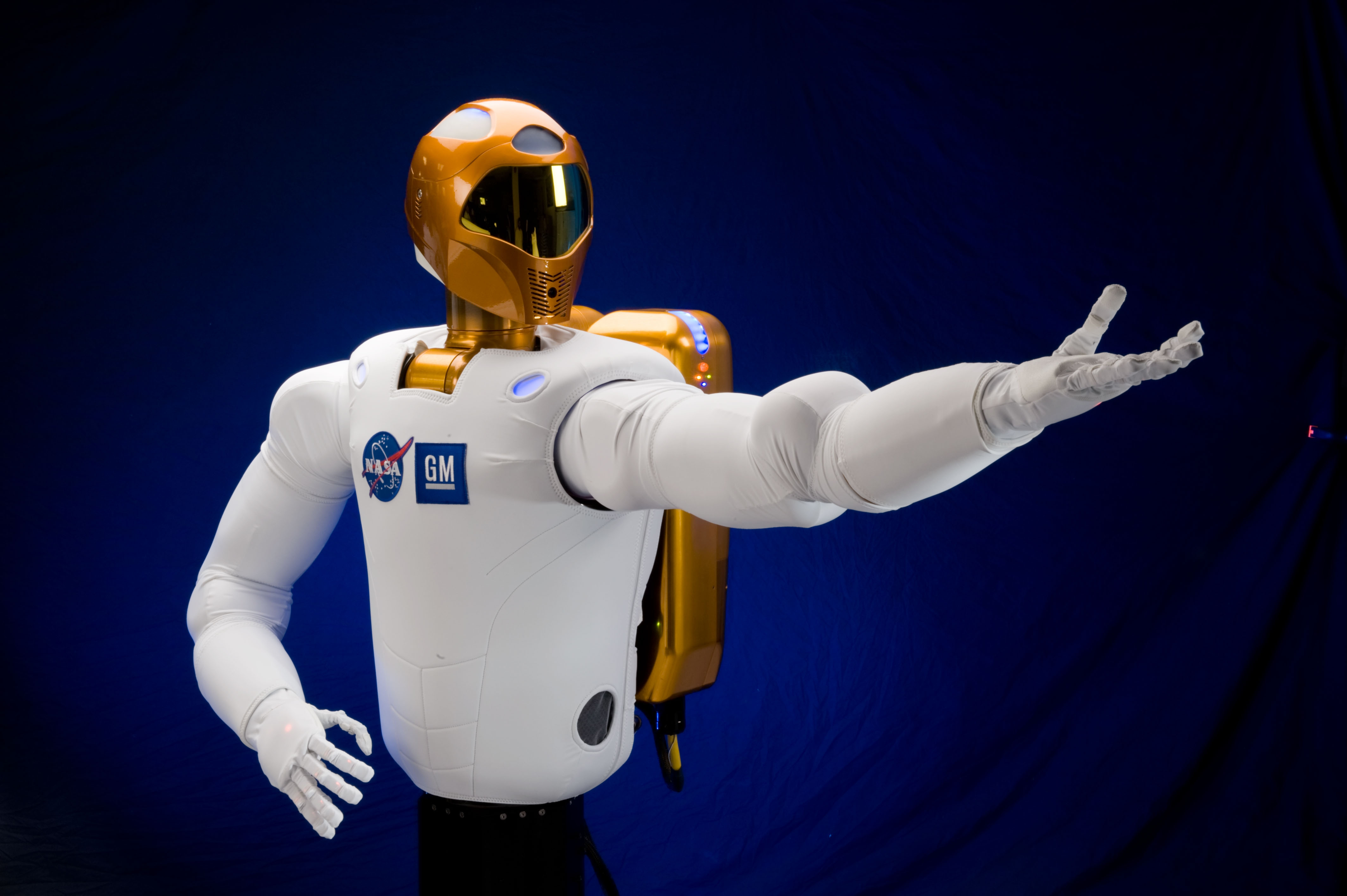
Robonaut 2

Project M was a proposed NASA project to send a Robonaut to the Moon. This was originally hoped to be achieved in just a thousand days from the official announcement, but was later shifted into Project Morpheus.

== History ==
NASA projected the project could have cost less than US$200 million. An additional $250 million would have been needed for the launch vehicle. The project could have been accomplished in a thousand days or less once it had been approved. The project would have used a variation of lander developed by Armadillo Aerospace. On June 23, 2010, a flight carried a prototype known as the Guidance Embedded Navigator Integration Environment (GENIE). GENIE was developed to demonstrate fully functional, real-time, guidance, navigation, and control (GNC) code in a terrestrial rocket vehicle applicable to landing on the surface of the Moon.
