= Yubileyny, Russia =

Yubileyny (Russian: Юбиле́йный; masculine), Yubileynaya (Юбиле́йная; feminine), or Yubileynoye (Юбиле́йное; neuter) is the name of several rural localities in Russia.

== Modern localities ==
=== Amur Oblast ===
As of 2012, two rural localities in Amur Oblast bear this name:

- Yubileyny, Amur Oblast, a settlement in Yubileynensky Rural Settlement of Zeysky District
- Yubileynoye, Amur Oblast, a selo in Beloyarovsky Rural Settlement of Mazanovsky District

=== Republic of Buryatia ===
As of 2012, one rural locality in the Republic of Buryatia bears this name:

- Yubileyny, Republic of Buryatia, a settlement in Yubileyny Selsoviet of Barguzinsky District

=== Chechen Republic ===
As of 2012, one rural locality in the Chechen Republic bears this name:

- Yubileynoye, Chechen Republic, a selo in Levoberezhnenskaya Rural Administration of Naursky District

=== Republic of Dagestan ===
As of 2012, one rural locality in the Republic of Dagestan bears this name:

- Yubileynoye, Republic of Dagestan (or Yubileyny), a selo in Kizlyarsky Selsoviet of Kizlyarsky District; 43°54′N 46°45′E

=== Irkutsk Oblast ===
As of 2012, one rural locality in Irkutsk Oblast bears this name:

- Yubileyny, Irkutsk Oblast, a settlement in Kirensky District

=== Kaluga Oblast ===
As of 2012, one rural locality in Kaluga Oblast bears this name:

- Yubileyny, Kaluga Oblast, a settlement in Maloyaroslavetsky District

=== Khanty-Mansi Autonomous Okrug ===
As of 2012, one rural locality in Khanty-Mansi Autonomous Okrug bears this name:

- Yubileyny, Khanty-Mansi Autonomous Okrug, a settlement in Sovetsky District

=== Kirov Oblast ===
As of 2012, three rural localities in Kirov Oblast bear this name:

- Yubileyny, Kotelnichsky District, Kirov Oblast, a settlement in Yubileyny Rural Okrug of Kotelnichsky District; 58°30′N 48°16′E
- Yubileyny, Omutninsky District, Kirov Oblast, a settlement in Vyatsky Rural Okrug of Omutninsky District; 58°49′N 42°47′E
- Yubileyny, Orichevsky District, Kirov Oblast, a settlement in Lugobolotny Rural Okrug of Orichevsky District; 58°28′N 49°13′E

=== Krasnodar Krai ===
As of 2012, one rural locality in Krasnodar Krai bears this name:

- Yubileyny, Krasnodar Krai, a settlement in Fontalovsky Rural Okrug of Temryuksky District; 45°19′N 36°59′E

=== Kursk Oblast ===
As of 2012, one rural locality in Kursk Oblast bears this name:

- Yubileyny, Kursk Oblast, a settlement in Shchetinsky Selsoviet of Kursky District

=== Mari El Republic ===
As of 2012, one rural locality in the Mari El Republic bears this name:

- Yubileyny, Mari El Republic, a settlement in Yubileyny Rural Okrug of Medvedevsky District; 56°46′N 48°13′E

=== Novgorod Oblast ===
As of 2012, one rural locality in Novgorod Oblast bears this name:

- Yubileyny, Novgorod Oblast, a settlement in Yubileyninskoye Settlement of Khvoyninsky District

=== Orenburg Oblast ===
As of 2012, one rural locality in Orenburg Oblast bears this name:

- Yubileyny, Orenburg Oblast, a settlement in Yubileyny Selsoviet of Adamovsky District

=== Perm Krai ===
As of 2012, two rural localities in Perm Krai bear this name:

- Yubileyny, Gremyachinsk, Perm Krai, a settlement under the administrative jurisdiction of the town of krai significance of Gremyachinsk
- Yubileyny, Sivinsky District, Perm Krai, a settlement in Sivinsky District

=== Saratov Oblast ===
As of 2012, two rural localities in Saratov Oblast bear this name:

- Yubileyny, Novouzensky District, Saratov Oblast, a khutor in Novouzensky District
- Yubileyny, Yekaterinovsky District, Saratov Oblast, a settlement in Yekaterinovsky District

=== Tambov Oblast ===
As of 2012, one rural locality in Tambov Oblast bears this name:

- Yubileyny, Tambov Oblast, a settlement in Balykleysky Selsoviet of Inzhavinsky District

=== Tula Oblast ===
As of 2012, one rural locality in Tula Oblast bears this name:

- Yubileyny, Tula Oblast, a settlement in Yasnopolyanskaya Rural Administration of Shchyokinsky District

=== Tver Oblast ===
As of 2012, one rural locality in Tver Oblast bears this name:

- Yubileyny, Tver Oblast, a settlement under the administrative jurisdiction of Likhoslavl Urban Settlement in Likhoslavlsky District

=== Vologda Oblast ===
As of 2012, two rural localities in Vologda Oblast bear this name:

- Yubileyny, Totemsky District, Vologda Oblast, a settlement in Pogorelovsky Selsoviet of Totemsky District
- Yubileyny, Ustyuzhensky District, Vologda Oblast, a settlement in Ustyuzhensky Selsoviet of Ustyuzhensky District

=== Yaroslavl Oblast ===
As of 2012, one rural locality in Yaroslavl Oblast bears this name:

- Yubileyny, Yaroslavl Oblast, a settlement in Makarovsky Rural Okrug of Rybinsky District

=== Zabaykalsky Krai ===
As of 2012, one rural locality in Zabaykalsky Krai bears this name:

- Yubileyny, Zabaykalsky Krai, a settlement in Krasnokamensky District

== Abolished localities ==
- Yubileyny, Moscow Oblast, a town in Moscow Oblast; merged into the city of Korolyov in June 2014; 55°56′N 37°51′E
