= Nikolai Chernyshev =

Russian rocket scientist (1906–1953)

- Никола́й Чернышёв
- Born: Nikolai Gavrilovich Chernyshev; September 9, 1906; Kazanskaya, Russia
- Died: January 2, 1953 (aged 46); Moscow, Soviet Union
- Education: Leningrad State Institute of Technology (BS); Academy of Sciences of the Soviet Union (DSc)
- Years active: 1933-1953

Nikolai Gavrilovich Chernyshev (/tʃɛrˈnɪʃɛf/; cher-NYSH-ef; September 9 [O.S. August 27] 1906 – January 2, 1953) was a Soviet rocket scientist and propellant chemist. He played a major role in the early development of Soviet rocketry and published the first Soviet monograph on the subject of rocket propellant chemistry. He co-designed the VR-190, the Soviet Union's first sub-orbital human spaceflight project. For much of the Cold War era, his identity and work remained classified.

In 1966, the Academy of Sciences of the Soviet Union named a lunar crater on the far side of the Moon after him. The International Astronomical Union (IAU) formally ratified the name of Chernyshev crater in 1970.

== Early life and education ==
Chernyshev was born in 1906 in the stanitsa of Kazanskaya, a village in Kuban in the Caucasus Viceroyalty of the Russian Empire, to a Cossack family of schoolteachers. They moved to Yekaterinodar (now Krasnodar), where he attended the Kuban Alexandrovsky Real School. Between 1918 and 1920, during the turmoil of the Russian Civil War, he returned to Kazanskaya to study and work before graduating from the 7th Soviet Secondary School in Krasnodar in 1924.

He missed the entrance examinations for Moscow State University in 1925. Unable to study, he worked as a packer in a Moscow printing house and, after January 1926, at a consumer cooperative in Rostov-on-Don. Later that year, he began studying at the Don Polytechnic Institute in Novocherkassk before transferring in 1929 to the Leningrad State Institute of Technology, where he graduated in 1932.

== Early career in rocketry ==
After graduating, Chernyshev was assigned to the Goznak printing factory in Leningrad before being called up for active military service. He joined the Gas Dynamics Laboratory, the first Soviet research organization dedicated to rocket technology, as a senior engineer in 1933. There, he contributed to the development of the OR-2 engine, intended for a piloted rocket-powered aircraft, and the 12K engine designed for Sergei Korolev's cruise missiles. He also helped to establish the motor laboratory.

From August 1936 to April 1938, he headed the test station at KB-7, conducting bench tests of liquid propellant rocket engines (LREs) and overseeing flight testing of rockets.

== World War II combat ==
After Germany's invasion of the Soviet Union on June 22, 1941, Chernyshev volunteered for the front lines. He served as deputy chief of the artillery supply service in the 27th Army. He organized the evacuation of military trains from Nasva on July 22 while directing a defense against enemy ground and air attacks, sustaining a head injury in the process. In August 1942, serving as head of inspection for the artillery command of the 4th Shock Army, he extracted a two-gun 107 mm artillery battery with ammunition from the Grishin partisan detachment in Smolensk Oblast. He was awarded the Order of the Patriotic War, 2nd Class.

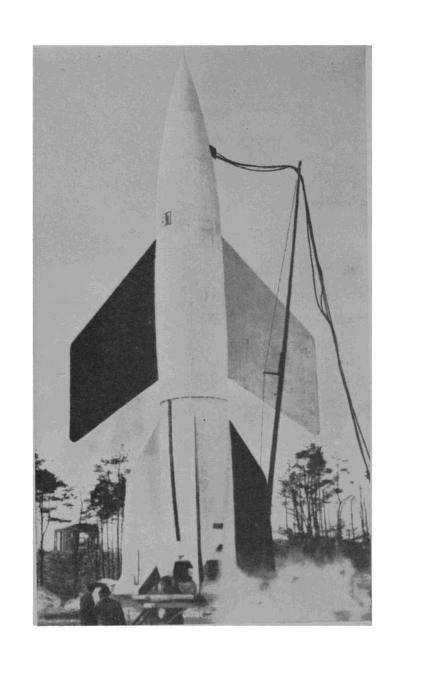
Captured German V-2 rocket (1946)

In October 1942, he was recalled from the front and appointed head of the chemical laboratory at the Reactive Scientific Research Institute (RNII) by the Council of People's Commissars of the USSR. He joined the Mendeleev Moscow Institute of Chemical Technology as a research fellow, leading a group that developed new explosive compositions for aerial bombs based on tetranitromethane. He also undertook inspection missions at sites of captured German rocket technology in Poland beginning in August 1944, Romania beginning in December, and Germany itself in June 1945 after the end of World War II.

== Postwar work and the VR-190 ==
A year after the war's end, Chernyshev was appointed head of the RNII's department of liquid fueled anti-aircraft projectiles by the USSR Ministry of Defence in November 1946. He and Mikhail Tikhonravov began developing the VR-190, nicknamed the Vysotnaya Raketa (High-Altitude Rocket), soon after. The VR-190 program was the USSR's first formal proposal for suborbital human spaceflight, envisaging two pilots reaching an altitude of 190–200 km aboard a modified German V-2-derived vehicle. The project introduced several concepts that would later become standard in spaceflight, including a parachute descent system, retropropulsive landing for soft touchdown, a sealed crew cabin with a life-support system, and attitude control using low-thrust nozzles. The proposal was positively received by the Soviet aviation ministry and reportedly by Stalin himself, and was presented to the Soviet Academy of Sciences in early 1946. It was later transferred to Korolev's bureau in 1948, before ultimately being superseded by the Vostok program.

In 1949, he published a book promoting the primacy of Russians in developing the fundamentals of rocket science. Soon after, he publicly accused spaceflight scientist Ary Abramovich Sternfeld of having "disdain" for Russian and Soviet achievements in rocket science and being "filled with admiration" for Western scientists in order to win the Robert Esnault-Pelterie Prize from the Société astronomique de France in 1932. He published the denunciation in Kultura i zhizn, a Soviet propaganda magazine, at the height of the state-guided antisemitic campaign, targeting Sternfeld, a Jewish foreigner, whose Polish origins and Western scientific connections made him a convenient political target during a period when such accusations could result in arrest and deportation to a labor camp. Sternfeld's articles were no longer published, and works already in print were destroyed, including an article on the Tunguska event. Sternfeld fought back, writing letters to newspapers and to Central Committee Secretary Mikhail Suslov, emphasizing his longstanding promotion of Russian scientific achievements and his personal ties to Konstantin Tsiolkovsky. He was ultimately spared the severest consequences, though he never again worked in rocketry.

Chernyshev authored the monograph Chemistry of Rocket Propellants (1948), for which the Academic Council of the Soviet Academy of Sciences awarded him a Doctor of Science degree, bypassing the intermediate Candidate of Sciences step, a rare distinction. His studies focused primarily on the characteristics and industrial production of tetranitromethane, improving the combustion process in liquid rocket engine chambers, hypergolic propellant self-ignition, and combustion in pulse detonation engines. In 1952, he formulated solutions to problems of air defense over the Soviet Union's territory. He also played an active role in founding the rocket engineering faculty at Bauman Moscow State Technical University, delivering lecture courses there and at the Mendeleev Institute.

Among his practical engineering achievements were the design and construction of a liquid nitrogen production laboratory, a test chamber for studying ozone self-ignition, the first design of a 100-ton liquid rocket engine with a tubular screen in the combustion chamber, and a self-regulating calorimeter for measuring fuel calorific values. He held 16 patents.

== Death and legacy ==
Chernyshev died in Moscow on January 2, 1953, aged 46. He was buried at Vagankovo Cemetery.

His name was classified for most of the Cold War. A museum dedicated to him was opened in 1996 at Secondary School No. 20 (formerly No. 6) in his home village of Kazanskaya. It is the only museum in Russia devoted to a rocket propellant pioneer.

In 1966, the Commission of the USSR Academy of Sciences on Lunar Names named a crater on the far side of the Moon in his honor, grouping him among other commemorated GDL personnel. The naming was officialized by the IAU in 1970. He was also named an Honorary Citizen of the city of Yubileyny for his contribution to Soviet rocketry.

== Awards ==
- Order of the Patriotic War, 2nd Class (1944 and April 14, 1945)
- Order of the Red Star (1944)
- Medal "To a Partisan of the Patriotic War", 2nd class (1943)
- Medal "For the Victory over Germany in the Great Patriotic War 1941–1945" (1945)
- Honorary citizen of Yubileyny, Russia
- Chernyshev crater
