= Canadian Arrow =

Canadian space tourism company

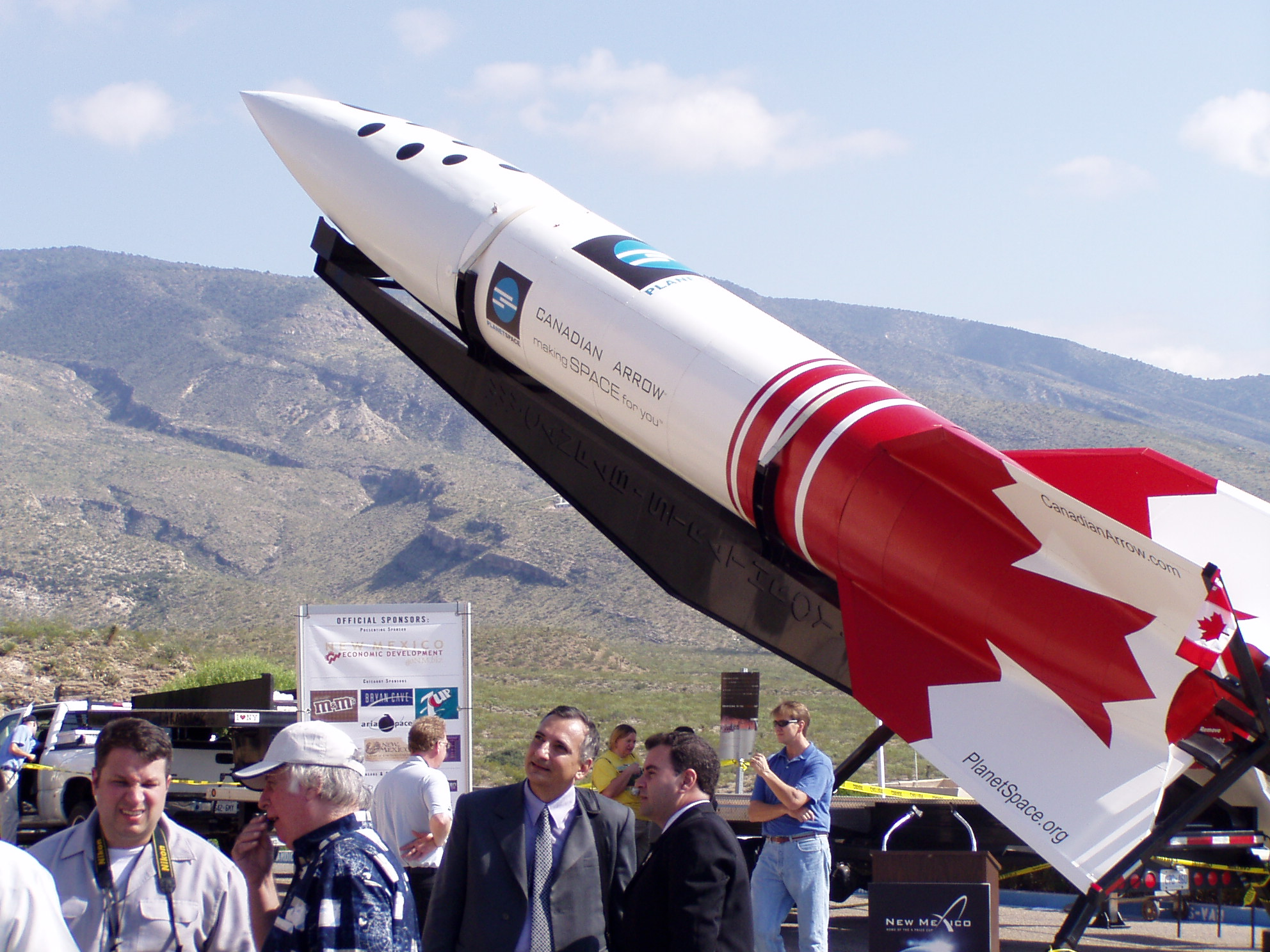
- Type: Corporation
- Industry: Aerospace
- Founded: 1999
- Headquarters: Corunna, Ontario, Canada
- Area served: North America
- Products: Rocket, spacecraft
- Services: Tourism

The Canadian Arrow was a privately funded, Canadian, early-2000s rocket and space tourism project concept founded by London, Ontario, based entrepreneurs Geoff Sheerin, Dan McKibbon and Chris Corke. The project's objective was to take the first civilians into space, on a vertical fully reusable sub-orbital spaceflight reaching an altitude of 112 km.

Canadian Arrow was considered one of the top three candidates for the X-Prize competition, along with Scaled Composites (Burt Rutan), and Armadillo Aerospace (John Carmack). Scaled Composites won the competition on October 4, 2004.

The Canadian Arrow team's motto was "making SPACE for you". Their rocket was based on the German V-2 to simplify development by reducing required research. They completed the first series of tests on their 57,000 lbf (254 kN) thrust engine and built a space training centre and a full-scale mock-up of their rocket. After an open nomination process, they also recruited a team of six astronauts from around the world, including several seasoned military pilots and a NASA-trained astronaut from Ukraine. Astronaut candidates – the group "Arrow Six" included David Ballinger, Ted Gow, Terry Wong, Jason Dyer, Larry Clark and Yaroslav "Yarko" Pustovyi, the only member of the team with actual space training.

In November 2010 Geoff Sheerin, the president of Canadian Arrow stated the company was unlikely to fly a Canadian Arrow rocket as a space tourism vehicle.

The Canadian Arrow never flew a powered crewed or uncrewed flight, although performed an uncrewed drop test.

== Design ==
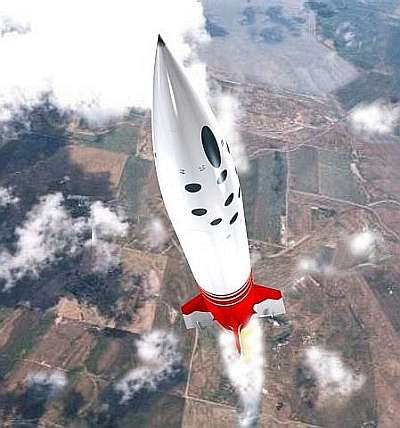
A rendering of a Canadian Arrow vehicle in flight

The Canadian Arrow was a 16.5 m tall two-stage rocket, where the second stage was a three-person space capsule. The Canadian Arrow team's somewhat conservative approach was to base the design of their rocket engine and aerodynamics on the well proven V-2 design from World War II.

=== First stage ===
The rocket's first stage was 10.2 m long and 1.7 m in diameter. It was propelled by a single liquid fuel rocket engine. It produced a thrust of 254 kN. Graphite jet vanes were used for stabilisation before the rocket has reached a velocity high enough for the four fins to be effective. About one minute after ignition, the fuel was depleted and the engine shut off.

=== Second stage ===
The rocket's second stage was 6 m long and 1.7 m in diameter at the base. It carried three astronauts and was propelled by four JATO-type solid rocket engines. These were ignited immediately after stage separation, and carried the capsule to an altitude of ~112 km. Cold gas jets were planned to be used for attitude control.

=== Crew Cabin Escape System ===
The design proposed four solid rocket engines in the second stage that could be fired at any time, even when the rocket stands on its launch pad. This constituted an escape system, which could, in a case of an emergency, quickly separate the second stage from the rocket and propel it to an altitude of 1.5 km, where its parachutes could be deployed.

=== Rocket engine ===
The rocket engine was to use alcohol and liquid oxygen as propellants, and produces a maximum thrust of 254 kN, and burns for 55s, burning out at 27 km. It was constructed of low carbon steel, with propellant injectors made out of brass.

=== Flight profile ===
The Canadian Arrow rocket was to launch vertically from the ground. Initial thrust was ~75.5 kN, but the rocket quickly reached maximum thrust. After 55s, the propellant was depleted and stage separation occurred. The solid fuel rockets in the second stage were ignited and boosted it up to an altitude of ~112 km, where the crew and passengers would have experienced a few minutes of "zero-G", or weightlessness.

After stage separation the first stage reached an apogee of over 80 km before descent begun. Four parachutes slow the Canadian Arrow's first stage down before splashdown occurred at a speed of ~9 m/s, after which recovery of the spacecraft could take place.

During descent, the crew cabin (the second stage) was planned to use a ballute to reduce its speed. When its velocity became subsonic, the second stage's ballute was to be released and pull out the three parachutes before splashdown.

=== Testing ===
- Summer, 2002: Single burner cup engine test.
- October 5, 2002: The rocket test stand complete.
- November 7, 2003: First engine tests conducted.
- August 14, 2004: Canadian Arrow carried out a successful drop test of the crew cabin, to test the parachutes and recovery routines.

== Funding, commercial aspects and the future ==
Canadian Arrow started as a team competing in the international X-Prize competition, with the ultimate goal of continuing past the X-Prize into the commercial sector providing private access to space. Funding during the X-Prize was provided by sponsorship and private investment.

In early 2003 the company would receive a major infusion of financial support by Canadian Arrow partner and Director of Spacecraft Development - Lou van Amelsvoort. As a result, during the next two years the company would also proceed to open the world's first private Astronaut training facility, continue vehicle development, and test propulsion and recovery systems.

Canadian Arrow founders from left to right: Dan McKibbon, Chris Corke, Geoff Sheerin.

Geoff Sheerin, president and CEO of Canadian Arrow, and Dr. Chirinjeev Kathuria announced on May 17, 2005, the creation of PlanetSpace Corporation. It was through this enterprise that Canadian Arrow would complete the construction of their spacecraft, and within 24 months offer suborbital space flight to aspiring space tourists. Planetspace expected to fly about 2,000 new astronauts within five years of operation. The price was expected to be $250,000 for each flight, including fourteen days of training. Cape Breton Island, in Nova Scotia was being considered as a launch site, and a contract was signed with the government of Nova Scotia to provide 120 acres (0.49 km^{2}) of land for the project.

A requirement of the X-Prize for each participating company was to propose other possible markets for their spacecraft. Canadian Arrow coined the term "Spacediving", while investigating the possible use of Canadian Arrow spacecraft for a high altitude version of skydiving.

On November 11, 2005, Canadian Arrow teamed up with former X-Prize competitor Romanian aerospace company, ARCASPACE, to develop privately built spacecraft.

On December 15, 2005 PlanetSpace Corporation unveiled plans for an orbital commercial vehicle capable of carrying eight passengers. This vehicle was to be called the Silver Dart and it was based on the U.S. Air Force's Flight Dynamics Laboratory-7 lifting body program from the 1970s. PlanetSpace Corporation became defunct as of 6 February 2013.

On June 21, 2013, Blackburn news reported that the full scale engineering mock-up of the Canadian Arrow rocket was purchased by Sarnia Ontario's Preferred Towing. Having spent several years at Chris Hadfield Airport in Sarnia, Ontario, Preferred Towing expressed interest in hopes of restoring the rocket for display in Sarnia. This plan has since been scrapped and the mock-up no longer exists.

== Picture gallery ==
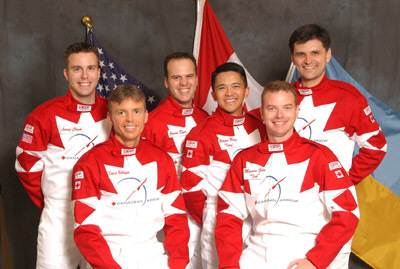
Canadian Arrow Astronauts.

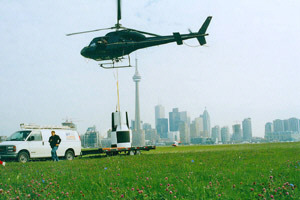
Helicopter beginning Canadian Arrow's crew cabin drop test on the Toronto Islands, August 14, 2004.

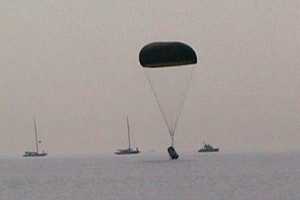
Canadian Arrow's crew cabin drop test parachute landing, August 14, 2004.

Former Canadian Arrow Engineering Department members.

Canadian Arrow concept rendering of a water lift off.

== See also ==
- Armadillo Aerospace
- CORONA
- Interorbital Systems
- Kankoh-maru
- List of private spaceflight companies - A compiled list of private spaceflight companies
- Lunar Lander Challenge
- Masten Space Systems
- McDonnell Douglas DC-X
- Project VR-190 - Proposed crewed sub-orbital spaceflight
- Project Morpheus NASA program to continue developing ALHAT and Q landers
- Quad (rocket)
- Reusable Vehicle Testing program by JAXA
- SpaceX reusable launch system development program
- Terry Wong, pilot
- Zarya
