= Yubileyny =

Yubileyny (masculine), Yubileynaya (feminine), or Yubileynoye (neuter) may refer to:

- Yubileyny, Russia (Yubileynaya, Yubileynoye), several rural localities in Russia
- Yubileyny Urban Okrug, a former municipal formation which the former town of Yubileyny in Moscow Oblast, Russia was incorporated as
- Yubileyny Sports Palace, in Saint Petersburg, Russia
- Yubileiny (Yubileyny), a Russian satellite
- Yubileynaya mine, a coal mine in Kemerovo Oblast, Russia
- Yubileynaya (Moscow Metro), a planned station of the Moscow Metro, Moscow, Russia
- Yubileynoye, Kazakhstan, a village in Almaty Oblast of Kazakhstan
- Yubileyniy Airport, an airport at Baikonur Cosmodrome, Kazakhstan
