= Silver Dart =

Silver Dart may refer to:

- AEA Silver Dart - An early aircraft which was flown off the ice at Baddeck, Nova Scotia on February 23, 1909. This was the first controlled powered flight in Canada.
- Silver Dart (spacecraft) - A privately funded rocket and space travel project founded by London, Ontario based firm PlanetSpace.
