= 2004 United States Senate election in Illinois =

- November 2, 2004
- Turnout: 68.56%▲18.31 pp

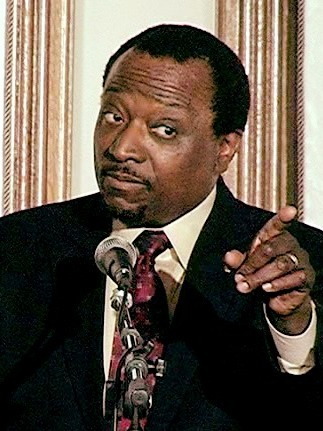
Nominee	Barack Obama	Alan Keyes (replacing Jack Ryan)
Party	Democratic	Republican
Popular vote	3,597,456	1,390,690
Percentage	69.97%	27.05%
- County results Obama: 40–50% 50–60% 60–70% 70–80% 80–90% Keyes: 50–60%
U.S. senator before election
Peter Fitzgerald
Republican
Elected U.S. Senator
Barack Obama
Democratic

The 2004 United States Senate election in Illinois was held on November 2, 2004. Republican incumbent Peter Fitzgerald decided to retire after one term in office. Democratic state senator and future president Barack Obama won the open seat over Alan Keyes, who was a late replacement for the original Republican nominee, investment banker Jack Ryan, who withdrew following a sex scandal. Obama's landslide victory, along with his well-received keynote address at the 2004 Democratic National Convention during the race, launched him into national prominence and set up his 2008 election to the presidency.

Primary elections were held on March 16. The open race, which was a first for this seat since 1980, drew a large and wealthy field of candidates. In total, at least 15 candidates, including seven millionaires, ran in the primary elections and spent a record sum of over $60 million, triggering the first application of the millionaires' amendment to the Bipartisan Campaign Reform Act of 2002. In the Democratic primary, Obama came from behind in the polls to defeat a large field of opponents, including state comptroller Daniel Hynes and financier Blair Hull, with a surprisingly large majority of the vote. Ryan won the Republican nomination over a large field of Republicans, including dairy farmer Jim Oberweis, state senator Steve Rauschenberger, and businessman Andrew McKenna.

Obama was the early favorite over Ryan in general election polling, but the race was overshadowed by Chicago Tribune reporting on Ryan's child custody lawsuit against his ex-wife Jeri Ryan, which included allegations that Ryan had pressured his then-wife to perform sexual acts in public. Ryan withdrew from the race on July 29, leaving Obama without a Republican opponent. Having apparently won the seat by midsummer, Obama instead focused on his keynote address in support of Democratic presidential nominee John Kerry and supporting other Democratic candidates in Illinois and throughout the country, further enhancing his rising political profile. Six weeks after Ryan's withdrawal, the Illinois Republican Party chose Keyes, a resident of Maryland with a history of landslide losses, as their replacement nominee. Keyes ran an advocacy campaign focused on social issues, and Obama maintained a strong lead in polling through Election Day. Overall, Obama outspent Keyes by over $12 million, among the largest margins in United States Senate history in both absolute and relative terms.

Obama won the election with 70 percent of the vote, the largest margin of victory for any U.S. Senate candidate in Illinois history and significantly larger than Kerry's 55 percent in the concurrent presidential election. Obama carried 92 of the state's 102 counties, including several rural and suburban counties where the Democratic Party had traditionally performed poorly. This was the first United States Senate election in history in which both major party candidates were African American. According to Obama's 2020 memoir A Promised Land, he promised his wife Michelle that if he lost the race, he would retire from politics.

== Background ==
The primaries and general elections coincided with those for federal offices (president and House), as well as those for state offices.

For the primary elections, turnout was 26.69%, with 1,904,800 votes cast. For the general election, turnout was 68.56%, with 5,141,520 votes cast.

== Republican primary ==
=== Candidates ===
- John L. Borling, retired U.S. Air Force major general
- Norm Hill, Army veteran
- Chirinjeev Kathuria, healthcare and technology businessman
- Andrew McKenna, businessman and son of Andrew J. McKenna
- Jim Oberweis, owner of Oberweis Dairy and investment manager
- Steve Rauschenberger, state senator from Elgin
- Jack Ryan, investment banker
- Jonathan C. Wright, former state representative from Lincoln

==== Declined ====
- Jim Edgar, former governor of Illinois
- Peter G. Fitzgerald, incumbent senator since 1999 (announced retirement April 15, 2003)

In this campaign, Chirinjeev Kathuria became the first Indian American and the first Sikh to run for United States Senate.

=== Campaign ===
The Republican primary began in earnest on April 15, 2003, when one-term incumbent Peter G. Fitzgerald announced his retirement. Fitzgerald had developed a reputation as a maverick and a political moderate over his time in office, frequently clashing with fellow Republicans such as Governor George Ryan and United States House Speaker Dennis Hastert. Despite commissioning polling that showed him handily defeating all potential primary challengers and all potential Democratic opponents, Fitzgerald believed his poor relationships with other Illinois Republicans would have forced him to self-finance his re-election, something he did not want to do. His retirement was a blow to national Republican senate leadership, which had backed Fitzgerald's re-election out of a belief that he was best placed to hold the seat. At the time of his announcement, Fitzgerald had at least six Democratic opponents and at least three Republicans were threatening to challenge him in the primary.

After Fitzgerald's retirement and Edgar's decision, investment banker Jack Ryan was an early favorite for the party's nomination. Ryan was a proponent of broad tax reductions and tort reform, an effort to limit payout in medical malpractice lawsuits. He was also a proponent of school choice and supported vouchers for private school students. However, he was dogged throughout the campaign by his high-profile divorce from actress Jeri Ryan; the Chicago Tribune and local American Broadcasting Company affiliate WLS-TV sought repeatedly to unseal his divorce records during the primary. On March 3, shortly before the primary, Ryan's opponents urged him to release the records; both Ryan and his wife agreed to unseal their divorce records but preserve the court seal on their child custody dispute, claiming that the records could be harmful to their son if released.

Ryan's leading opponent in the polls was dairy farmer Jim Oberweis, who had run for Senate in 2002 and finished second in the Republican primary. Oberweis's 2004 campaign was notable for a television commercial where he flew in a helicopter over Soldier Field and claimed enough illegal immigrants entered the United States per week to fill the stadium's 61,500 seats. Oberweis was also fined $21,000 by the Federal Election Commission for a commercial for his dairy that ran during the campaign. The FEC ruled that the commercial wrongly benefited his campaign and constituted a corporate contribution on behalf of the dairy, thus violating campaign law.

=== Polling ===
Poll source	Date(s) administered	Sample size (Note: Key: A – all adults RV – registered voters LV – likely voters V – unclear)	Margin of error	Jack Ryan	Jim Oberweis	Steve Rauschenberger	Andrew McKenna	Jonathan Wright	John Borling	Norm Hill	Chirinjeev Kathuria	Other	Undecided
Chicago Tribune (Note: Poll conducted for WGN-TV)	March 3–6, 2004	580 (LV)	± 4.0%	32%	11%	8%	10%	1%	2%	<1%	<1%	–	35%
Rasmussen Reports (Note: Poll sponsored by Daily Southtown)	March 3, 2004	– (LV)	–	44%	18%	4%	10%	–	–	–	–	6%	18%
Chicago Tribune	February 11–17, 2004	– (LV)	–	30%	12%	4%	8%	–	–	–	–	–	43%
Chicago Tribune	January 6–11, 2004	503 (LV)	± 4.5%	12%	16%	5%	5%	–	–	–	–	–	57%
Chicago Tribune	October 15–20, 2003	450 (LV)	± 5.0%	20%	11%	4%	3%	–	–	1%	–	4%	58%

=== Debate ===
2004 United States Senate election in Illinois Republican primary debate
No.	Date	Host	Moderator	Link	Republican	Republican	Republican	Republican	Republican	Republican
Key: P Participant A Absent N Not invited I Invited W Withdrawn										
Key: P Participant A Absent N Not invited I Invited W Withdrawn					John L. Borling	Chirinjeev Kathuria	Andrew McKenna	Jim Oberweis	Steve Rauschenberger	Jack Ryan
1	Jan. 29, 2004	City Club of Chicago	Paul Green	YouTube	P	P	P	P	P	P

=== Endorsements ===
John Borling

Federal officials

- John McCain, U.S. senator from Arizona
Chirinjeev Kathuria

Organizations

- Independent Voters of Illinois-Independent Precinct Organization
Andrew McKenna

Executive officials

- Samuel K. Skinner, former White House chief of staff and former United States secretary of transportation

Federal officials

- Ray LaHood, U.S. representative from IL-18

State officials

- Greg Baise, businessman and former Illinois secretary of transportation
- Tyrone C. Fahner, former attorney general of Illinois

Individuals

- Pat Ryan, businessman

Organizations

- Illinois Right to Life
Steve Rauschenberger

Federal officials

- Henry Hyde, U.S. representative from IL-06

Individuals

- Tom Roeser, newspaper columnist and radio broadcaster

Newspapers & publications

- Chicago Tribune
- Daily Herald
Jack Ryan

Executive officials

- William Bennett, former United States secretary of education
- Jack Kemp, former U.S. secretary of housing and urban development

Newspapers & publications

- Chicago Sun-Times
Jonathan C. Wright

State officials

- Bill Mitchell, Illinois state representative from the 87th district
- Art Tenhouse, Illinois state representative from the 96th district

=== Results ===
Results by county Map legend: Ryan—50–60%; Ryan—40–50%; Ryan—30–40%; Oberweis—30–40%; Rauschenberger—30–40%; Rauschenberger—40–50%; Rauschenberger—50–60%; McKenna—30–40%; Wright—30–40%; Wright—40–50%

Republican primary results
Party	Candidate	Votes	%
Republican	Jack Ryan	234,791	35.5%
Republican	Jim Oberweis	155,794	23.5%
Republican	Steve Rauschenberger	132,655	20.0%
Republican	Andrew McKenna	97,238	14.7%
Republican	Jonathan C. Wright	17,189	2.6%
Republican	John L. Borling	13,390	2.0%
Republican	Norm Hill	5,637	0.9%
Republican	Chirinjeev Kathuria	5,110	0.8%
Total votes		661,804	100.0%

== Democratic primary ==
=== Candidates ===
==== Declared ====
- Gery Chico, former president of the Chicago Board of Education
- Blair Hull, financial technology executive
- Daniel Hynes, state comptroller
- Estella Johnson Hunt (write-in)
- Barack Obama, state senator from Hyde Park, Chicago and candidate for Illinois's 1st congressional district in 2000
- Maria Pappas, Cook County treasurer
- Nancy Skinner, radio personality
- Joyce Washington, health care executive

==== Withdrew ====
- Matt O'Shea, mayor of Metamora (endorsed Chico)

==== Declined ====
- Carol Moseley Braun, former U.S. senator (1993–99)

=== Campaign ===
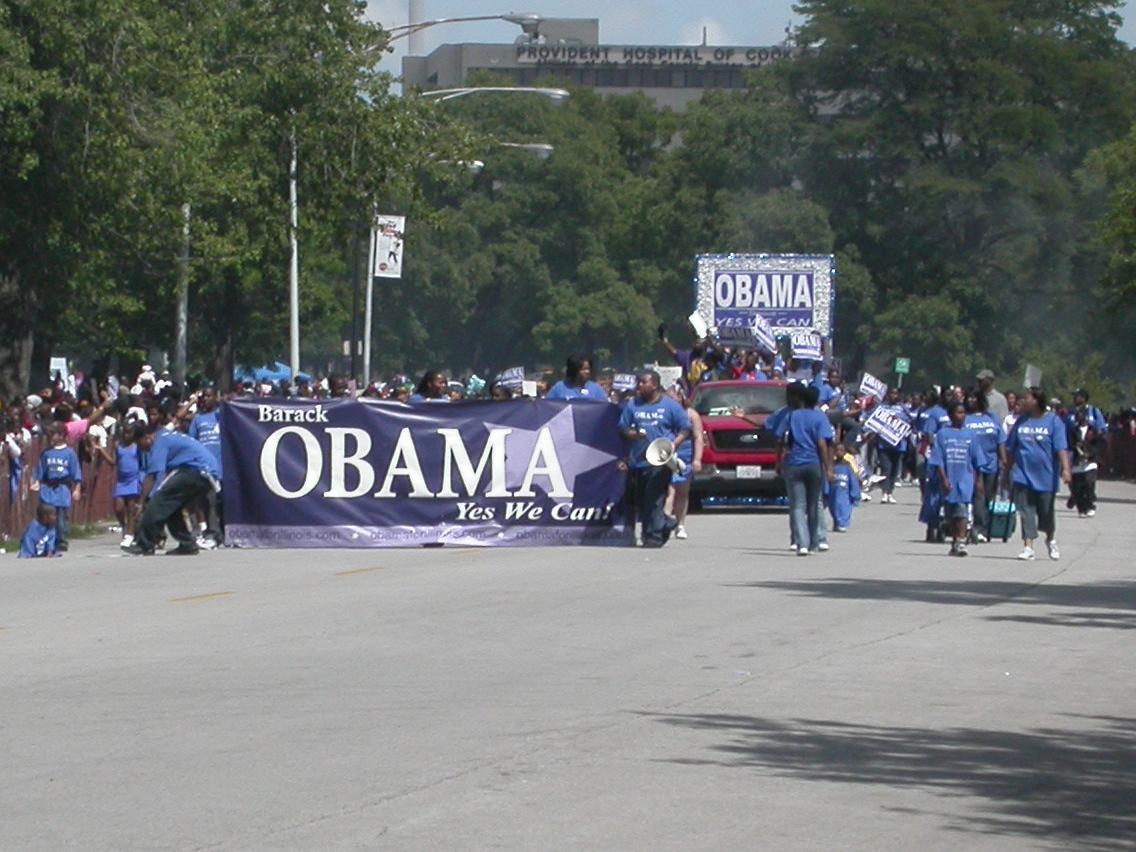
Obama float at the 2004 Bud Billiken Parade and Picnic

Early speculation on the Democratic side, prior to Fitzgerald's withdrawal, centered on Fitzgerald's predecessor, Carol Moseley Braun. However, she declined to seek the nomination on January 17, 2003. Barack Obama, a member of the Illinois Senate since 1997 who had unsuccessfully challenged U.S. representative Bobby Rush in the 2000 Democratic primary, had already launched a campaign fundraising committee in July 2002, and two months later had David Axelrod lined up to do his campaign media. Obama formally announced his candidacy on January 21, 2003, four days after Moseley Braun's announcement.

As the Democratic primary field firmed up by November 2003, Roll Call cited Obama, Illinois comptroller Daniel Hynes and multimillionaire securities trader Blair Hull as frontrunners. Obama was considered charismatic, and his status as the only prominent black candidate in the race and strength with "lakefront liberals" were expected to give him a solid political base. Hynes was expected to have strong backing from labor unions and the party establishment broadly, as well as name recognition from being elected statewide. Hull was considered a contender given his promise to spend $20 million on his bid. Of the other candidates, Roll Call cited Gery Chico for his strong fundraising and Maria Pappas for her name recognition, but neither were considered likely victors.

Obama touted his legislative experience and early public opposition to the Iraq War to distinguish himself from his Democratic primary rivals. Although Hynes won the endorsement of the AFL-CIO, Obama won the support of three of the state's largest and most active member unions: the AFSCME, the SEIU, and the Illinois Federation of Teachers. Obama had the endorsements of four sitting members of the United States House of Representatives (Jesse Jackson Jr., Danny Davis, Lane Evans, and Jan Schakowsky); Blair Hull (Bobby Rush and Luis Gutiérrez) and Dan Hynes (Jerry Costello and Bill Lipinski) each had two. Rahm Emanuel remained neutral.

In the final three weeks of the campaign, Obama surged into the lead after he finally began advertising on Chicago television, which was expanded to downstate Illinois during the last six days of the campaign. The ads included strong endorsements by the state's five largest newspapers—the Chicago Tribune, Chicago Sun-Times, Daily Herald, Rockford Register Star, and Journal Star—and a testimonial by Sheila Simon, daughter of the late U.S. Senator Paul Simon, who had planned to endorse and campaign for Obama before his unexpected death in December 2003.

=== Polling ===
Poll source	Date(s) administered	Sample size	Margin of error	Barack Obama	Daniel Hynes	Blair Hull	Maria Pappas	Gery Chico	Nancy Skinner	Joyce Washington	Undecided
Chicago Tribune	March 3–6, 2004	602 (LV)	± 4.0%	33%	19%	16%	8%	6%	1%	1%	16%
Rasmussen Reports	March 3, 2004	– (LV)	–	28%	22%	23%	10%	3%	1%	3%	11%
Rasmussen Reports	February 19, 2004	– (LV)	–	17%	17%	27%	14%	5%	2%	1%	16%
Chicago Tribune	February 11–17, 2004	– (LV)	–	15%	11%	24%	9%	5%	–	1%	34%
Chicago Tribune	January 6–11, 2004	528 (LV)	± 4.5%	14%	14%	10%	14%	6%	–	–	38%
Chicago Tribune	October 15–20, 2003	450 (LV)	± 5.0%	9%	12%	6%	16%	6%	3%	2%	45%
Chicago Tribune	October 15–20, 2003	450 (LV)	± 5.0%	10%	15%	6%	–	8%	4%	3%	54%

=== Debate ===
2004 United States Senate election in Illinois Democratic primary debate
No.	Date	Host	Moderator	Link	Democratic	Democratic	Democratic	Democratic	Democratic	Democratic
Key: P Participant A Absent N Not invited I Invited W Withdrawn										
Key: P Participant A Absent N Not invited I Invited W Withdrawn					Gery Chico	Daniel Hynes	Barack Obama	Maria Pappas	Nancy Skinner	Joyce Washington
1	Jan. 28, 2004	City Club of Chicago	Paul Green	YouTube	P	P	P	P	P	P

=== Endorsements ===
Gery Chico

State officials

- Susana Mendoza, Illinois state representative from the 1st district

Local officials

- Edward M. Burke, Chicago city alderman from the 14th Ward
- Ricardo Muñoz, Chicago city alderman from the 22nd Ward
- Bernard Stone, vice mayor of Chicago and Chicago city alderman from the 50th Ward
- Paul Vallas, former CEO of Chicago Public Schools

Individuals

- Neil Bluhm, businessman
Blair Hull

Federal officials

- Cardiss Collins, former U.S. representative from IL-07
- Luis Gutiérrez, U.S. representative from IL-04
- Bobby Rush, U.S. representative from IL-01

Local officials

- Richard Mell, former vice mayor of Chicago and Chicago city alderman from the 33rd Ward
Daniel Hynes

State officials

- Tom Hynes, former President of the Illinois Senate (candidate's father)
- Mike Madigan, Speaker of the Illinois House of Representatives

Local officials

- John P. Daley, Cook County commissioner
- John Stroger, Cook County Board president

Labor unions

- AFL-CIO
- International Brotherhood of Teamsters
Barack Obama

Executive officials

- Abner Mikva, former White House counsel and former U.S. Rrpresentative from IL-10
- Newton N. Minow, former chairman of the Federal Communications Commission

Federal officials

- Danny Davis, U.S. representative from IL-07
- Lane Evans, U.S. representative from IL-17
- Jesse Jackson Jr., U.S. senator from IL-02
- Jan Schakowsky, U.S. representative from IL-09
- Paul Simon, former U.S. senator from Illinois (deceased)

State officials

- Miguel del Valle, Illinois state senator from the 2nd district
- Emil Jones, president of the Illinois Senate

Local officials

- Sheila Simon, Carbondale city councillor and daughter of Paul Simon

Individuals

- David Axelrod, political consultant
- Michael Jordan, basketball player
- Michelle Obama, attorney (candidate's wife)
- R. Eugene Pincham, former judge of the Appellate Court of Illinois
- Penny Pritzker, businesswoman
- Alan Solow, consultant and lawyer
- Studs Terkel, writer, historian and radio broadcaster
- Jeremiah Wright, pastor

Labor unions

- American Federation of State, County and Municipal Employees
- Illinois Federation of Teachers
- Service Employees International Union

Organizations

- Independent Voters of Illinois-Independent Precinct Organization
- Planned Parenthood Illinois

Newspapers & publications

- Chicago Sun-Times
- Chicago Tribune
- St. Louis Post-Dispatch
Declined to endorse

State officials

- Rod Blagojevich, governor of Illinois

=== Results ===
On March 16, 2004, Obama won the Democratic primary by an unexpected landslide—receiving 53% of the vote, 29% ahead of his nearest Democratic rival, with a vote total that nearly equaled that of all eight Republican candidates combined—which overnight made him a rising star in the national Democratic Party, started speculation about a presidential future, and led to the reissue of his memoir, Dreams from My Father. The Democratic primary election, including seven candidates who combined to spend over $46 million, was the most expensive U.S. Senate primary election in history.

Results by county Map legend: Obama—60–70%; Obama—50–60%; Obama—40–50%; Obama—30–40%; Hynes—30–40%; Hynes—40–50%; Hynes—50–60%; Hynes—60–70%; Hynes—70–80%; Hull—30–40%; Hull—40–50%; Hull—50–60%

Democratic primary results
Party	Candidate	Votes	%
Democratic	Barack Obama	655,923	52.8%
Democratic	Daniel W. Hynes	294,717	23.7%
Democratic	M. Blair Hull	134,453	10.8%
Democratic	Maria Pappas	74,987	6.0%
Democratic	Gery Chico	53,433	4.3%
Democratic	Nancy Skinner	16,098	1.3%
Democratic	Joyce Washington	13,375	1.1%
Democratic	Estella Johnson-Hunt (write-in)	10	0.0%
Total votes		1,242,996	100.0%

== General election ==
=== Candidates ===
- Al Franzen, retired union leader from Hinckley (Independent)
- Alan Keyes, conservative activist, former U.S. assistant secretary of state for international organization affairs, and candidate for president of the United States in 1996 and 2000 (Republican)
- Jerry Kohn, Oak Lawn high school economics and government teacher (Libertarian)
- Barack Obama, state senator from Hyde Park, Chicago and candidate for Illinois's 1st congressional district in 2000 (Democratic)

==== Withdrew ====
- Jack Ryan, investment banker (Republican) (suspended campaign June 25; withdrew July 29)

=== Campaign ===
==== Obama vs. Ryan ====
Ryan trailed Obama in early polls and suffered an early setback after the Tribune reported that a Ryan campaign staffer tracked Obama's appearances. Although Obama acknowledged that campaign tracking is standard practice in politics, the aggressive use of the tactic by the Ryan campaign was criticized in the Tribune. Ryan's spokesman apologized and promised that the tracker would give Obama more space. Obama said he was satisfied with Ryan's decision.

As the campaign progressed, the Tribune lawsuit seeking to unseal the Ryans' child custody files continued. The Obama campaign emailed reporters about the story while refraining from on-the-record commentary. On March 29, Los Angeles County Superior Court judge Robert Schnider ruled that a court-appointed referee would decide which custody files should remain sealed to protect the interests of the couple's young child. A few days later, Obama changed his position, calling on Democrats not to make the Ryans' divorce a campaign issue. On June 22, after receiving the referee's report, Schnider publicly released those files that were deemed consistent with the interests of the Ryans' son. The released files included allegations by Jeri Ryan that Jack Ryan had taken her to sex clubs in several cities, intending for them to have sex in public. Schnider's decision was immediately controversial, because the release went against both parties' direct request and reversed the earlier decision to seal all files in the best interest of the child. Oberweis, Ryan's primary opponent, questioned whether the allegations had any public merit, remarking, "These are allegations made in a divorce hearing, and we all know people tend to say things that aren't necessarily true in divorce proceedings when there is money involved and custody of children involved."

Although some initial reaction sympathized with the couple, the sensational and sexual nature of the allegations made the revelations fodder for tabloid newspapers and television programs. The files also raised questions about whether Ryan had accurately described the documents to Republican leadership. Prior to release of the documents, Ryan had reportedly told leading Republicans that "five percent" of the divorce file could cause problems for his campaign. After the documents were released, Republican officials including state party chair Judy Baar Topinka said they felt Ryan had misleadingly indicated the divorce records would not be embarrassing. Some Republicans called for Ryan to withdraw from the race, and his campaign effectively ended less than a week after the records were unsealed, on June 25. Topinka, who was considering running herself, claimed that his decision was "a personal one" and that the state party had not pressured him to withdraw.

Ryan officially filed documentation to withdraw his name from the ballot on July 29, leaving the Republican Party without a candidate and Obama effectively unopposed. As the Ryan campaign collapsed, Obama delivered the keynote address at the 2004 Democratic National Convention on July 27. The speech was widely praised and pushed Obama into national political stardom.

==== Obama vs. Keyes ====
Over the next month, Edgar, Topinka, and former Chicago Bears head coach Mike Ditka all declined to run. Orion Samuelson was prepared to accept the nomination but abandoned those plans under a doctor's orders. Eventually, the Republican state committee settled on Alan Keyes, a former State Department official who had lost two earlier bids for U.S. Senate in his home state of Maryland and two bids for the Republican nomination for president in 1996 and 2000. Although Keyes was nationally known, he had few ties to Illinois, an unsuccessful electoral track record, and no momentum in the race. The local and national media lambasted Keyes for his parachute candidacy. The Chicago Tribune published a scathing editorial, calling Keyes a "rent-a-senator" and sarcastically spelling out local geography for a candidate they suspected had no familiarity with the area: "Keyes may have noticed a large body of water as he flew into O'Hare. That is called Lake Michigan. It's large. It's wide. It's deep. And we'll spoil the surprise: You can't even see across it." The New York Times published an editorial decrying Keyes's "rank hypocrisy", recalling that four years earlier, he had attacked Hillary Clinton for establishing residency in New York only two months before announcing her own U.S. Senate campaign in that state.

Obama and Keyes differed on many issues including school vouchers and tax cuts, both of which Keyes supported and Obama opposed. Keyes attacked Obama for voting against a bill that would have outlawed a form of late-term abortion. Race became an issue in the contest when Keyes claimed that he was the true "African-American" in the race. (Ultimately, 92 percent of Black voters in Illinois would vote for Obama.)

Obama largely ignored Keyes, leveraging his huge lead in polls to campaign outside of Illinois in support of other Democratic candidates, transfer large sums of campaign funds to other candidates and the Democratic Senatorial Campaign Committee, and sending many of his volunteers to work on other races, including that of Melissa Bean, who ultimately defeated longtime incumbent Phil Crane in the Chicago suburbs.

=== Campaign spending ===
The gap in spending by the two campaigns–$14,244,768 by Obama, and $2,545,325 by Keyes–was among the largest in United States Senate history in both absolute and relative terms.

=== Predictions ===
Source	Ranking	As of
Sabato's Crystal Ball	Safe D (flip)	November 1, 2004

=== Polling ===
Poll source	Date(s) administered	Sample size	Margin of error	Alan Keyes (R)	Barack Obama (D)	Other	Undecided
SurveyUSA (Note: Poll conducted for WBBM-TV and KSDK-TV)	October 27–29, 2004	655 (LV)	± 3.9%	27%	66%	5%	1%
Research 2000	October 27–28, 2004	600 (LV)	± 4.0%	25%	67%	–	8%
Research 2000 (Note: Poll sponsored by the St. Louis Post-Dispatch and KMOV-TV)	October 21–23, 2004	800 (LV)	± 3.5%	25%	67%	–	8%
Chicago Tribune	October 16–19, 2004	700 (LV)	± 4.0%	19%	66%	6%	9%
SurveyUSA	October 4–6, 2004	636 (LV)	± 4.0%	23%	68%	7%	2%
Rasmussen Reports	October 5, 2004	500 (LV)	± 4.5%	20%	64%	7% (Note: Albert Franzen (I) with 4%; Jerry Kohn (L) with 3%)	9%
Research 2000	October 3–4, 2004	600 (LV)	± 4.0%	24%	69%	–	7%
Chicago Tribune	September 17–20, 2004	700 (LV)	± 4.0%	17%	68%	3%	12%
Research 2000	September 14–16, 2004	800 (LV)	± 3.5%	23%	68%	–	9%
Chicago Tribune	August 13–16, 2004	700 (LV)	± 4.0%	24%	65%	–	11%
SurveyUSA	August 8–6, 2004	612 (RV)	± 4.0%	28%	67%	–	5%

Hypothetical polling

Jack Ryan vs. Barack Obama

Poll source	Date(s) administered	Sample size	Margin of error	Jack Ryan (R)	Barack Obama (D)	Other	Undecided
Chicago Tribune	May 21–24, 2004	600 (RV)	± 4.0%	30%	52%	–	8%
Rasmussen Reports	May 12, 2004	500 (LV)	± 4.5%	40%	48%	–	12%

=== Results ===
The race was one of the first to be called on Election Day.

2004 United States Senate election in Illinois
Party	Candidate	Votes	%	±%
Democratic	Barack Obama	3,597,456	69.97%	+22.6%
Republican	Alan Keyes	1,390,690	27.05%	−23.3%
Independent	Al Franzen	81,164	1.6%	N/A
Libertarian	Jerry Kohn	69,253	1.3%	N/A
Write-in		2,957	0.1%	N/A
Total votes		5,141,520	100.0%	N/A
Democratic gain from Republican				

==== By county ====
By county

County	Barack Obama Democratic		Alan Keyes Republican		Other Third party/Write-in		Margin		Total votes
County	#	%	#	%	#	%	#	%	Total votes
Adams	16,036	52.38%	13,857	45.12%	720	2.35%	2,179	7.12%	30,613
Alexander	2,395	65.60%	1,148	31.44%	108	2.96%	1,247	34.16%	3,651
Bond	4,227	58.78%	2,717	37.78%	247	3.43%	1,510	21.00%	7,191
Boone	11,206	58.62%	7,317	38.28%	592	3.10%	3,889	20.35%	19,115
Brown	1,308	53.26%	1,073	43.69%	75	3.05%	235	9.57%	2,456
Bureau	10,648	61.12%	6,284	36.07%	489	2.81%	4,364	25.05%	17,421
Calhoun	1,604	61.69%	912	35.08%	84	3.23%	692	26.62%	2,600
Carroll	4,961	62.47%	2,730	34.38%	250	3.15%	2,231	28.09%	7,941
Cass	3,341	61.30%	1,896	34.79%	213	3.91%	1,445	26.51%	5,450
Champaign	51,813	64.53%	25,548	31.82%	2,936	3.66%	26,265	32.71%	80,297
Christian	9,323	62.52%	5,101	34.21%	489	2.66%	14,913	28.31%	12,417
Clark	3,566	46.52%	3,833	50.01%	266	3.47%	-267	-3.48%	7,665
Clay	2,505	39.77%	3,614	57.37%	180	2.86%	-1,109	-17.61%	6,299
Clinton	9,437	57.10%	6,565	39.72%	526	3.18%	2,872	17.38%	16,528
Coles	12,758	57.77%	8,625	39.06%	700	3.17%	4,133	18.72%	22,083
Cook	1,629,296	81.14%	329,671	16.42%	49,112	2.45%	1,299,625	64.72%	2,008,079
Crawford	4,302	48.08%	4,261	47.62%	385	4.30%	41	0.46%	8,948
Cumberland	2,598	49.34%	2,492	47.32%	176	3.34%	106	2.01%	5,266
DeKalb	26,077	65.70%	11,954	30.12%	1,663	4.19%	14,123	35.58%	39,694
DeWitt	4,340	57.51%	2,973	39.39%	234	3.10%	1,367	18.11%	7,547
Douglas	4,239	51.53%	3,717	45.18%	271	3.29%	522	6.34%	8,227
DuPage	251,445	64.30%	124,642	31.87%	14,954	3.82%	126,803	32.43%	391,041
Edgar	4,014	49.24%	3,858	47.33%	280	3.43%	156	1.91%	8,152
Edwards	1,155	36.91%	1,876	59.96%	98	3.13%	-721	-23.04%	3,129
Effingham	6,264	40.05%	8,930	57.09%	448	2.86%	-2,666	-17.04%	15,642
Fayette	4,826	52.22%	4,127	44.65%	289	3.13%	699	7.56%	9,242
Ford	3,021	48.44%	2,984	47.85%	231	3.70%	37	0.59%	6,236
Franklin	11,949	63.91%	6,221	33.27%	528	1.67%	5,728	30.63%	18,698
Fulton	11,729	70.13%	4,556	27.24%	440	2.63%	7,173	42.89%	16,725
Gallatin	2,109	70.63%	786	26.32%	91	3.05%	1,323	44.31%	2,986
Greene	3,343	57.36%	2,281	39.14%	204	3.50%	1,062	18.22%	5,828
Grundy	12,285	63.79%	6,308	32.76%	665	3.45%	5,977	31.04%	19,258
Hamilton	2,458	57.51%	1,680	39.31%	136	3.18%	778	18.20%	4,274
Hancock	5,143	53.84%	4,125	43.18%	284	2.97%	1,018	10.66%	9,552
Hardin	1,253	53.78%	991	42.53%	86	3.69%	262	11.24%	2,330
Henderson	2,704	67.10%	1,195	29.65%	131	3.25%	1,509	37.44%	4,030
Henry	15,965	64.53%	8,219	33.22%	557	2.25%	7,746	31.31%	24,741
Iroquois	6,177	46.33%	6,736	50.52%	420	3.15%	-559	-4.19%	13,333
Jackson	17,295	69.04%	6,924	27.64%	831	3.32%	10,371	41.40%	25,050
Jasper	2,141	42.30%	2,768	54.68%	153	3.02%	-627	-12.39%	5,062
Jefferson	9,111	55.79%	6,778	41.50%	443	2.71%	2,333	14.28%	16,332
Jersey	5,670	57.91%	3,825	39.07%	296	3.02%	1,845	18.84%	9,791
Jo Daviess	6,714	60.75%	3,968	35.91%	369	3.34%	2,746	24.85%	11,051
Johnson	2,781	49.87%	2,617	46.93%	178	3.19%	164	2.94%	5,576
Kane	101,105	63.32%	52,319	32.77%	6,252	3.92%	48,786	30.55%	159,676
Kankakee	28,164	63.85%	14,614	33.13%	1,334	3.02%	13,550	30.72%	44,112
Kendall	18,450	58.85%	11,522	36.75%	1,381	4.40%	6,928	22.10%	31,353
Knox	17,098	70.27%	6,703	27.55%	531	2.18%	10,395	42.72%	24,332
Lake	183,717	68.59%	75,199	28.08%	8,925	3.33%	108,518	40.52%	229,413
LaSalle	32,193	65.02%	15,676	31.66%	1,640	3.31%	16,517	33.36%	49,509
Lawrence	3,255	50.50%	2,956	45.86%	235	3.65%	299	4.64%	6,446
Lee	8,873	57.07%	6,186	39.79%	488	3.14%	2,687	17.28%	15,547
Livingston	8,474	54.76%	6,513	42.08%	489	3.16%	1,961	12.67%	15,476
Logan	6,945	53.99%	5,517	42.89%	401	3.12%	1,428	11.10%	12,863
Macon	30,729	60.84%	18,511	36.65%	1,265	2.50%	12,218	24.19%	50,505
Macoupin	14,423	65.10%	6,946	31.35%	785	3.54%	7,477	33.75%	22,154
Madison	77,208	64.00%	39,431	32.69%	3,999	3.31%	37,777	31.31%	120,638
Marion	10,088	60.39%	6,099	36.51%	517	3.10%	3,989	23.88%	16,704
Marshall	3,909	60.89%	2,354	36.67%	157	2.45%	1,555	24.22%	6,420
Mason	4,498	64.84%	2,230	32.15%	209	3.01%	2,268	32.69%	6,937
Massac	3,309	46.27%	3,689	51.59%	153	2.14%	-380	-5.31%	7,151
McDonough	9,422	65.23%	4,693	32.49%	330	2.28%	4,729	32.74%	14,445
McHenry	76,652	61.62%	42,936	34.51%	4,814	3.87%	33,716	27.10%	124,402
McLean	43,027	61.65%	25,040	35.87%	1,731	2.48%	17,987	25.77%	69,798
Menard	3,529	56.15%	2,453	39.03%	303	4.82%	1,076	17.12%	6,285
Mercer	5,729	66.27%	2,685	31.06%	231	2.67%	3,044	35.21%	8,645
Monroe	9,150	58.12%	6,089	38.68%	504	3.20%	3,061	19.44%	15,743
Montgomery	7,903	63.52%	4,078	32.78%	461	3.71%	3,825	30.74%	12,442
Morgan	8,578	58.37%	5,478	37.28%	640	4.35%	3,100	21.09%	14,696
Moultrie	3,449	55.41%	2,622	42.13%	153	2.46%	827	13.29%	6,224
Ogle	12,903	54.77%	9,912	42.07%	743	3.15%	2,991	12.70%	23,558
Peoria	55,061	67.58%	24,888	30.55%	1,521	1.87%	30,173	37.04%	81,470
Perry	6,464	64.33%	3,285	32.69%	299	1.56%	3,179	31.64%	10,048
Piatt	4,548	54.98%	3,396	41.05%	328	3.97%	1,152	13.93%	8,272
Pike	3,887	50.21%	3,573	46.15%	282	3.64%	314	4.06%	7,742
Pope	1,211	52.54%	1,020	44.25%	74	3.21%	191	8.29%	2,305
Pulaski	1,749	58.97%	1,137	38.33%	80	2.70%	612	20.63%	2,966
Putnam	2,192	67.43%	971	29.87%	88	2.71%	1,221	37.56%	3,251
Randolph	9,009	62.53%	4,961	34.43%	437	3.03%	4,048	28.10%	14,407
Richland	3,048	40.92%	4,185	56.19%	2.89	2.18%	-1,137	-15.27%	7,448
Rock Island	49,096	71.08%	18,620	26.96%	1,356	1.96%	30,476	44.12%	69,072
Saline	6,851	60.84%	4,133	36.71%	276	2.45%	2,718	24.14%	11,260
Sangamon	57,385	62.38%	29,432	31.99%	5,181	5.63%	27,953	30.38%	91,998
Schuyler	2,241	57.71%	1,542	39.71%	100	2.58%	699	18.00%	3,883
Scott	1,315	52.43%	1,101	43.90%	92	3.67%	214	8.53%	2,508
Shelby	5,364	52.29%	4,626	45.09%	269	2.62%	738	7.19%	10,259
St. Clair	74,447	67.12%	33,288	30.01%	3,188	2.87%	41,159	37.11%	110,923
Stark	1,722	58.75%	1,119	38.18%	90	3.07%	603	20.57%	2,931
Stephenson	12,244	59.11%	7,882	38.05%	589	2.84%	4,362	21.06%	20,715
Tazewell	36,058	59.67%	22,955	37.99%	1,414	2.34%	13,103	21.68%	60,427
Union	4,761	54.91%	3,338	38.50%	571	6.59%	1,423	16.41%	8,670
Vermilion	19,500	59.16%	12,413	37.66%	1,048	3.18%	7,087	21.50%	32,961
Wabash	2,404	41.94%	3,110	54.26%	218	3.80%	-706	-12.32%	5,732
Warren	5,402	65.40%	2,685	32.51%	173	2.09%	2,717	32.89%	8,260
Washington	4,110	53.54%	3,315	43.19%	251	3.27%	795	10.36%	7,676
Wayne	3,233	40.58%	4,502	56.51%	232	2.91%	-1,269	-15.93%	7,967
White	4,038	51.56%	3,492	44.59%	301	3.84%	546	6.97%	7,831
Whiteside	17,585	67.23%	7,879	30.12%	693	2.65%	9,706	37.11%	26,157
Will	162,891	66.76%	72,786	29.83%	8,326	3.41%	90,105	36.93%	244,003
Williamson	17,113	58.94%	10,902	37.55%	1,018	3.51%	6,211	21.39%	29,033
Winnebago	74,911	62.89%	40,470	33.98%	3,727	3.13%	34,441	28.92%	119,108
Woodford	9,304	50.86%	8,550	46.74%	438	2.39%	754	4.12%	18,292
Totals	3,597,456	69.97%	1,390,690	27.05%	153,374	2.98%	2,206,766	42.92%	5,141,520

==== Counties that flipped from Republican to Democratic ====
- Bond (largest city: Greenville)
- Bureau (largest city: Princeton)
- Cass (largest city: Beardstown)
- Christian (largest city: Taylorville)
- Clinton (largest city: Breese)
- Coles (largest city: Charleston)
- DeKalb (largest city: DeKalb)
- Fayette (largest city: Vandalia)
- Greene (largest city: Carrollton)
- Grundy (largest city: Morris)
- Hamilton (largest city: McLeansboro)
- Hancock (largest city: Hamilton)
- Hardin (largest city: Rosiclare)
- Jefferson (largest city: Mount Vernon)
- Jersey (largest city: Jerseyville)
- Jo Daviess (largest city: Galena)
- Kankakee (largest city: Kankakee)
- Marion (largest city: Centralia)
- Marshall (largest city: Henry)
- Mason (largest city: Havana)
- McDonough (largest city: Macomb)
- Moultrie (largest city: Sullivan)
- Piatt (largest city: Monticello)
- Pike (largest city: Pittsfield)
- Pope (largest city: Golconda)
- Randolph (largest city: Chester)
- Saline (largest city: Harrisburg)
- Schuyler (largest city: Rushville)
- Shelby (largest city: Shelbyville)
- Union (largest city: Anna)
- Vermilion (largest city: Danville)
- Warren (largest city: Monmouth)
- Will (largest city: Joliet)
- Williamson (largest city: Marion)
- Winnebago (largest city: Rockford)
- Franklin (largest city: West Frankfort)
- Henry (largest city: Kewanee)
- LaSalle (largest city: Ottawa)
- Macon (largest city: Decatur)
- Macoupin (largest city: Carlinville)
- Montgomery (largest city: Litchfield)
- Perry (largest city: Du Quoin)
- Boone (largest city: Belvidere)
- Carroll (largest city: Savanna)
- DuPage (largest city: Aurora)
- Kane (largest city: Aurora)
- Kendall (largest village: Oswego)
- McHenry (largest city: Crystal Lake)
- McLean (largest city: Bloomington)
- Stephenson (largest city: Freeport)
- Adams (largest city: Quincy)
- Brown (largest city: Mount Sterling)
- Cumberland (largest city: Neoga)
- Crawford (largest city: Robinson)
- DeWitt (largest city: Clinton)
- Douglas (largest city: Tuscola)
- Edgar (largest city: Paris)
- Ford (largest city: Paxton)
- Livingston (largest city: Pontiac)
- Lee (largest city: Dixon)
- Logan (largest city: Lincoln)
- Madison (largest city: Granite City)
- Menard (largest city: Petersburg)
- Mercer (largest city: Aledo)
- Monroe (largest city: Waterloo)
- Morgan (largest city: Jacksonville)
- Ogle (largest city: Rochelle)
- Peoria (largest city: Peoria)
- Putnam (largest city: Hennpin)
- Sangamon (largest city: Springfield)
- Scott (largest city: Winchester)
- Tazewell (largest city: Pekin)
- Washington (largest city: Nashville)
- Calhoun (largest village: Hardin)
- Fulton (largest city: Canton)
- Henderson (largest village: Oquawka)
- Knox (largest city: Galesburg)
- Pulaski (largest city: Mounds)
- Champaign (largest city: Champaign)
- Rock Island (largest city: Moline)
- Lake (largest city: Waukegan)
- Whiteside (largest city: Sterling)
- Woodford (largest city: Eureka)
- Johnson (largest city: Vienna)
- Jackson (largest city: Carbondale)
- St. Clair (largest city: Belleville)

== Analysis ==
=== Voter demographics ===
Voter demographic data for 2004 was collected by CNN. The voter survey is based on exit polls completed by 1,373 voters in person as well as by phone.

2004 United States Senate election voter demographics in Illinois (CNN)
Demographic subgroup	Keyes	Obama	% of total vote
Ideology
Liberals	8	91	23
Moderates	18	80	50
Conservatives	61	33	27
Party
Democrats	5	94	40
Republicans	56	40	33
Independents	24	74	27
Gender
Men	30	67	45
Women	25	73	55
Race/ethnicity
White	31	66	78
Black	8	92	10
Latino	17	82	9
Asian	N/A	N/A	2
Other	N/A	N/A	1
Gender by race/ethnicity
White men	33	64	36
White women	28	69	42
Non-White men	19	81	10
Non-White women	11	88	13
Age
18–29 years old	25	73	21
30–44 years old	27	70	30
45–59 years old	26	72	29
60 and older	32	65	20
Income
Under $15,000	28	72	7
$15–30,000	27	71	12
$30–50,000	29	70	24
$50–75,000	27	71	24
$75–100,000	24	72	14
$100–150,000	24	70	11
$150–200,000	N/A	N/A	4
$200,000 or More	25	75	4
Religion
Protestant	37	60	47
Catholic	23	75	36
Jewish	N/A	N/A	3
Other	8	92	5
None	15	84	9
Issue regarded as most important
War in Iraq	12	88	21
Economy/Jobs	4	93	20
Moral Issues	61	38	19
Terrorism	40	51	18
Healthcare	12	88	5
Taxes	41	59	5
Education	25	75	5
Decision to go to war in Iraq
Strongly Approve	65	29	22
Somewhat Approve	38	59	25
Somewhat Disapprove	11	87	18
Strongly Disapprove	4	94	34
Bush job approval
Strongly Approve	61	34	28
Somewhat Approve	38	56	19
Somewhat Disapprove	13	87	15
Strongly Disapprove	4	96	38
Region
Chicago	11	88	20
Cook County Suburbs	23	75	20
Collar counties	32	65	23
Northern Illinois	35	62	24
Southern Illinois	36	61	13
Area type
Urban	19	80	31
Suburban	27	70	47
Rural	40	58	22

== Aftermath ==
Following the election, Keyes refused to call Obama to congratulate him. Media reports claimed that Keyes also failed to concede the race to Obama. Two days after the election, a radio interviewer asked Keyes whether he had conceded the race. Keyes replied, "Of course I've conceded the race. I mean, I gave my speech to that effect."

On the radio program, Keyes explained that his refusal to congratulate Obama was "not anything personal," but was meant to make a statement against "extend[ing] false congratulations to the triumph of what we have declared to be across the line." He said that Obama's position on moral issues regarding abortion and the family had crossed that line. "I'm supposed to make a call that represents the congratulations toward the triumph of that which I believe ultimately stands for... a culture evil enough to destroy the very soul and heart of my country? I can't do this. And I will not make a false gesture," Keyes said.

Obama would go on to be elected president of the United States in 2008.

== See also ==
- 2004 United States Senate elections

== Notes ==
Partisan clients
