= John L. Borling =

American air force general

John Borling
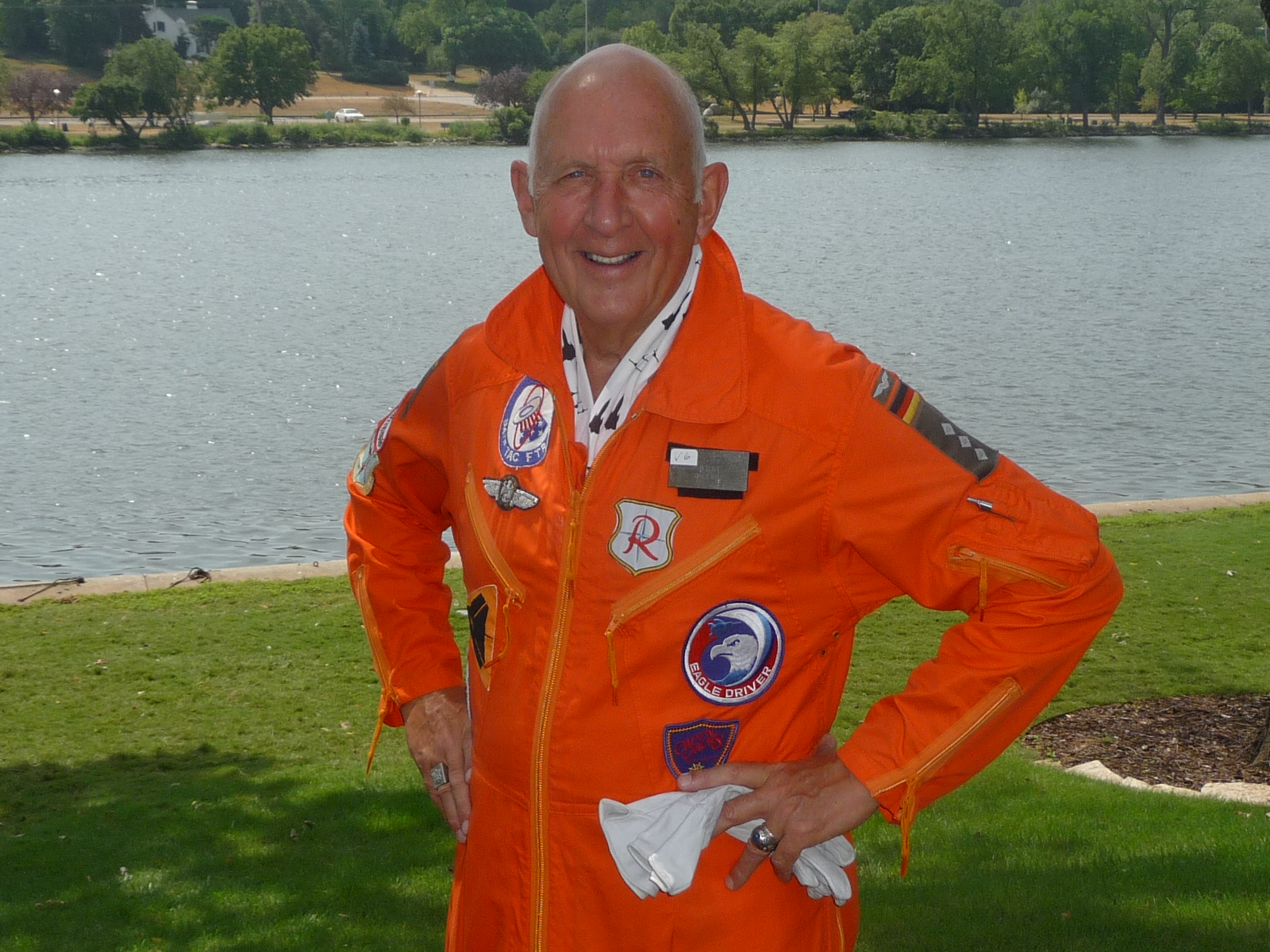
- John Borling in a flight suit, July 2012
- Born: March 24, 1940 (age 86); Chicago, Illinois, U.S.
- Military career
- Allegiance: United States
- Branch: United States Air Force
- Service years: 1963–1996
- Rank: Major General
- Commands: 57th Air Division (1987–88); 86th Fighter Group (1982–84); 94th Fighter Squadron (1976–79)
- Conflicts: Vietnam War
- Awards: Defense Distinguished Service Medal (2); Air Force Distinguished Service Medal; Silver Star; Defense Superior Service Medal; Legion of Merit (2); Distinguished Flying Cross (2); Bronze Star Medal (3); Purple Heart (2)

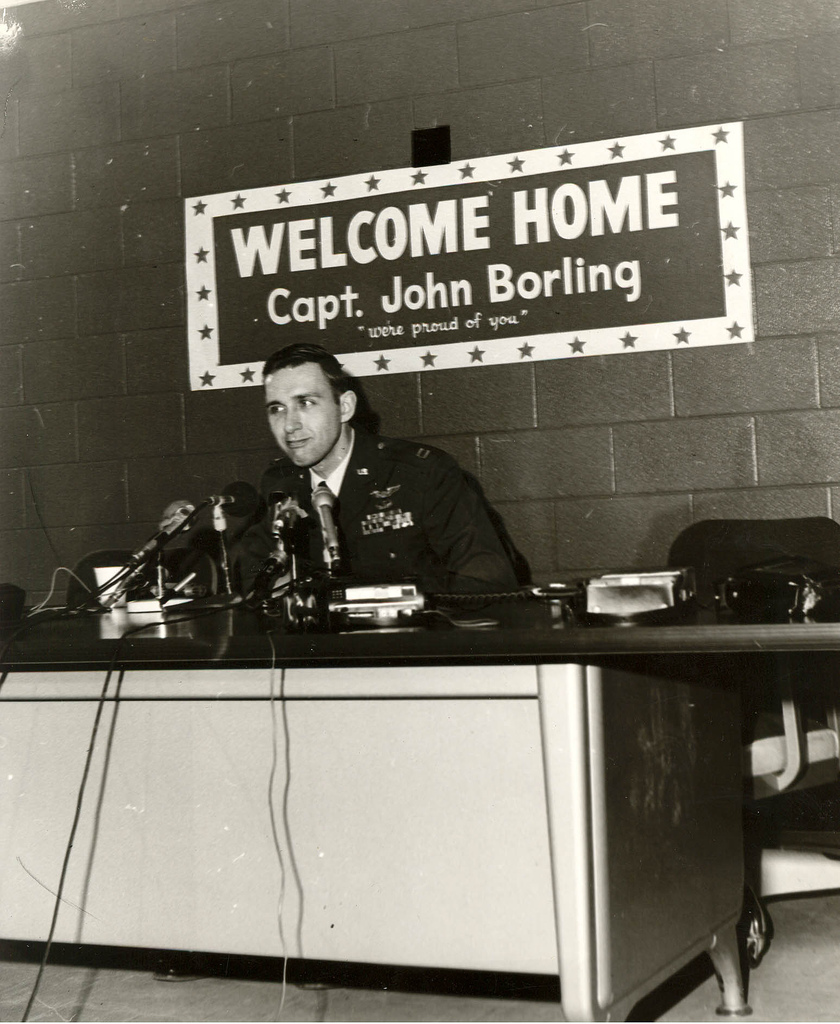
John Borling after return to the US

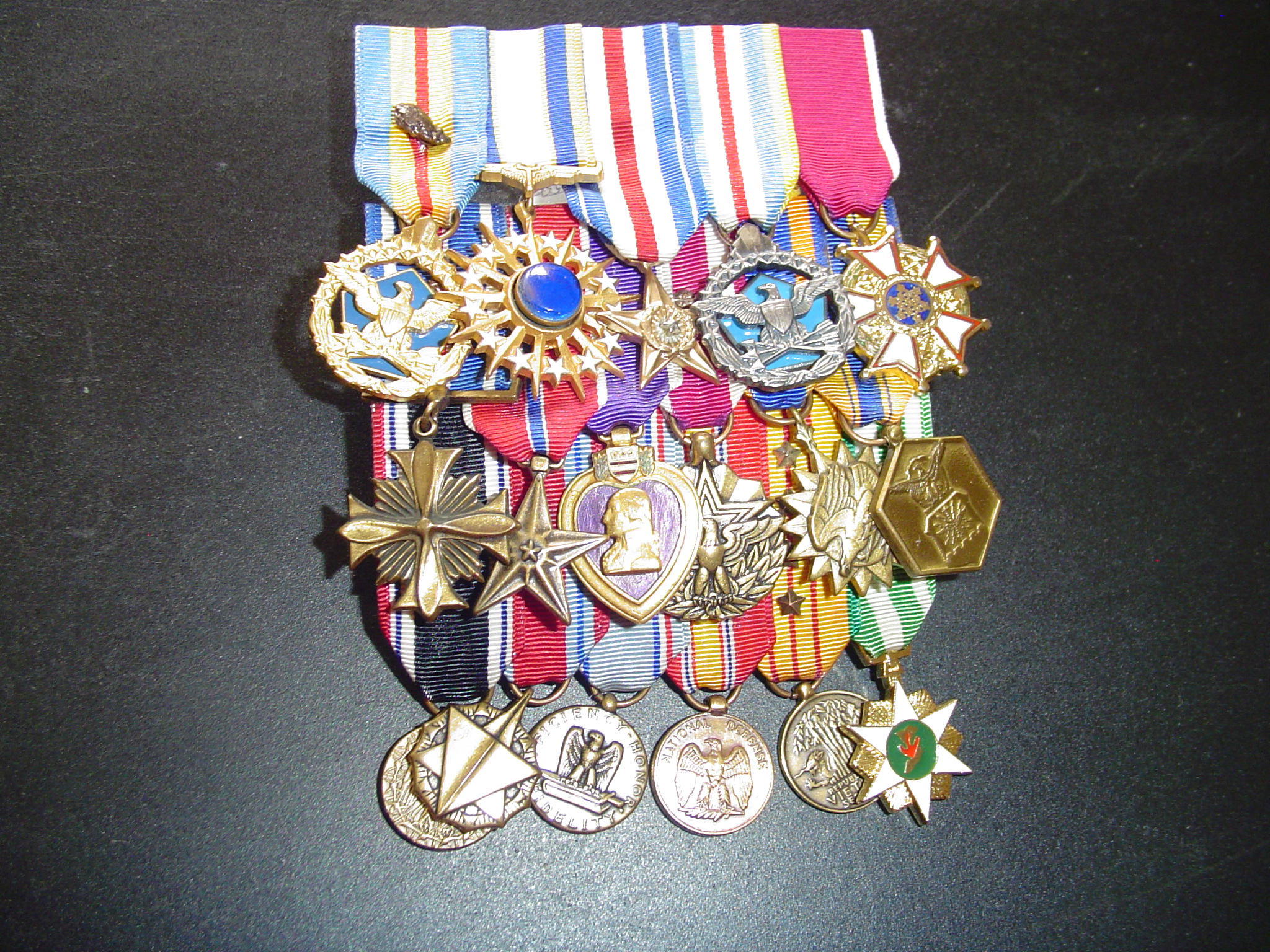
Medals Awarded

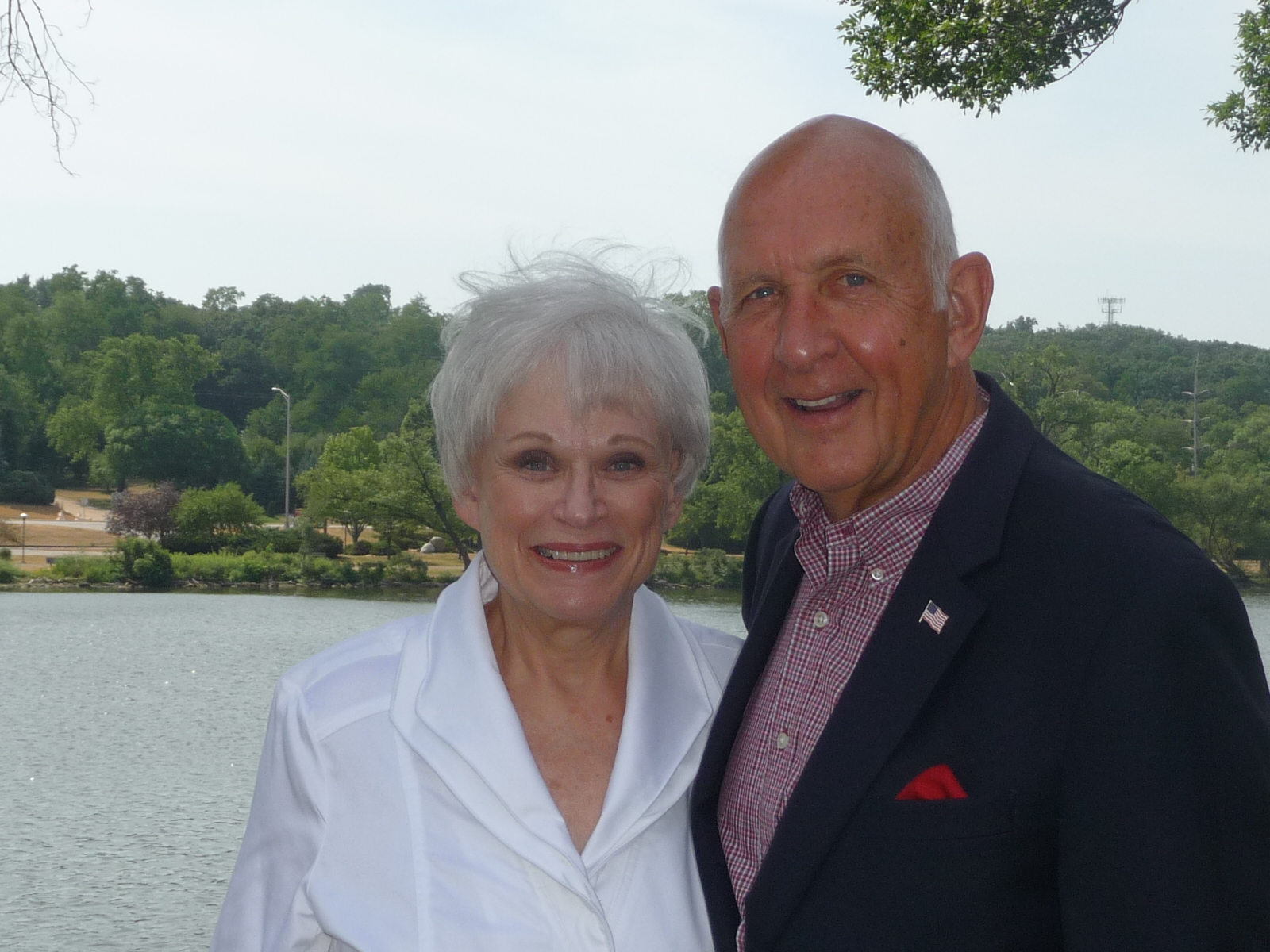
John Borling and his wife Myrna

John Lorin Borling (born March 24, 1940) is a retired major general of the United States Air Force whose military career spanned 33 years. He has piloted many aircraft including the F-15, F16, F-4, the SR-71 Blackbird, the U-2, and B-52 and B-1 bombers. During the Vietnam War, his aircraft was shot down and he spent 6½ years as a prisoner of war in Hanoi.

== Education ==
Borling attended the United States Air Force Academy, and was subsequently a graduate of the National War College and executive programs at the John F. Kennedy School of Government and the Harvard Business School. He was a White House Fellow and, later, treasurer and director of the White House Fellows governing foundation and for many years a regional selection panel member.

== Military career ==
Borling was a fighter pilot during the Vietnam War, where he was shot down by ground fire. Seriously injured in his crash, Captain Borling still attempted to commandeer a Vietnamese supply truck for his escape. He was able to gain control of a supply truck, but the truck was carrying Vietnamese regulars. Borling was soon overpowered by the soldiers and would spend the next 6½ years as a prisoner of war in Hanoi. John Borling was released on February 12, 1973.

Subsequent to his return, Borling was an F-15 Eagle fighter pilot and commander of the "Hat in the Ring" squadron. He was an Air Division commander at Minot AFB, and Head of Operations for Strategic Air Command (SAC) in Omaha. In that position, he directed SAC's support of hostilities in the first Gulf War and Panama and was charged with execution responsibilities for the nation's nuclear war plan. At the Pentagon, he led CHECKMATE, a highly classified war fighting think tank and was Director of Air Force Operational Requirements helping initiate a new family of guided weapons. In Germany, he commanded the largest fighter and support base outside the United States and later served at NATO's Supreme Headquarters in Belgium working directly for the Supreme Commander and Chief of Staff. He was central to the creation of HQ North in Norway and served as Chief of Staff of that integrated NATO/National command.

== Writing ==
Borling created Taps on the Walls: Poems from the Hanoi Hilton: a collection of poems he wrote during his time in captivity.

== Civic activities ==
Civic activities include: The Commercial Club of Chicago, Trustee, The Lincoln Academy of Illinois, Chicago Host Committee, The Medal of Honor Society Convention, President, Sister Lakes Michigan Land Conservancy, Inductee, Illinois Aviation Hall of Fame, Who's Who in America, and numerous other local and national organizations. The Chicago Crime Commission, Member.

In 2004, Borling was a candidate in the Republican Primary for the United States Senate. He finished sixth with 2.0% of the primary vote.

== Awards and decorations ==
A highly decorated officer, Borling's awards include: the Defense Distinguished Service Medal with oak leaf cluster, Air Force Distinguished Service Medal, the Silver Star, Defense Superior Service Medal, Legion of Merit with oak leaf cluster, Distinguished Flying Cross with oak leaf cluster, Bronze Star Medal with "V" device and two oak leaf clusters, Purple Heart with oak leaf cluster, Meritorious Service Medal with oak leaf cluster, Air Medal with five oak leaf clusters, Air Force Commendation Medal with two oak leaf clusters, and the Prisoner of War Medal.

US Air Force Command Pilot Badge
Parachutist Badge
Defense Distinguished Service Medal with bronze oak leaf cluster	Air Force Distinguished Service Medal	Silver Star
Defense Superior Service Medal	Legion of Merit with bronze oak leaf cluster	Distinguished Flying Cross with Valor device and bronze oak leaf cluster
Bronze Star Medal with Valor device and two bronze oak leaf clusters	Purple Heart with bronze oak leaf cluster	Meritorious Service Medal with bronze oak leaf cluster
Air Medal with silver oak leaf cluster	Air Force Commendation Medal with two bronze oak leaf clusters	Air Force Presidential Unit Citation
Joint Meritorious Unit Award with bronze oak leaf cluster	Air Force Outstanding Unit Award with Valor device and bronze oak leaf cluster	Air Force Organizational Excellence Award with two bronze oak leaf clusters
Prisoner of War Medal	Combat Readiness Medal	Air Force Good Conduct Medal
National Defense Service Medal with service star	Vietnam Service Medal with three silver campaign stars	Air Force Overseas Short Tour Service Ribbon with one silver and two bronze oak leaf clusters
Air Force Overseas Long Tour Service Ribbon with bronze oak leaf cluster	Air Force Longevity Service Award with silver and bronze oak leaf clusters	Small Arms Expert Marksmanship Ribbon
Air Force Training Ribbon	Republic of Vietnam Gallantry Cross Unit Citation	Vietnam Campaign Medal

Borling was inducted as a Laureate of The Lincoln Academy of Illinois and awarded the Order of Lincoln (the State’s highest honor) by the Governor of Illinois on November 6, 2021.

== His publications ==
- Borling, John (2013). Taps on the Walls. Chicago: Master Wings Publishing LLC. ISBN 978-0615659053. OCLC 818738145.

== Personal life ==
Borling is married to his high school sweetheart, Myrna, also from Illinois. They have two daughters.
