= New Generation Power International =

- Company type: Private
- Industry: Energy
- Founded: 2010
- Founder: Chirinjeev Kathuria
- Headquarters: Chicago
- Website: www.newgenpower.com

New Generation Power International (NGPI) is an American energy company based in Chicago.

== History ==
The company was co-founded by chairman Chirinjeev Kathuria in 2010. The company develops renewable energy in international markets from resources, such as solar power, hydropower, biomass, wind power, geothermal, waste-to-energy, and cogeneration. It has also developed, invests, owns, and operates infrastructure assets in the areas of utility-scale power generation, and distributed generation.

=== Projects ===
NGPI was given a contract to develop solar and geothermal projects for the US Army, and built a solar power farm located at Chicago Rockford International Airport. NGPI formed a joint venture with Yilsan Holding, Mineks International and DCM Energy to install and operate a 100 megawatt geothermal power plant for the nation of Turkey. NGPI signed a cooperation agreement with the Republic of Srpska in 2012 to develop four hydro projects totaling 365 megawatts on the Lower Drina River. In collaboration Nippon Energy Solution, NGPI will build three 11.5 megawatt wood biomass power plants in Japan.
