= AIRO Group =

American aeronautical company

- Type: Public
- Industry: Aerospace and defense
- Founded: 2005
- Founder: Chirinjeev Kathuria
- Headquarters: Albuquerque, New Mexico, United States
- Area served: Worldwide
- Key people: Chirinjeev Kathuria (Executive Chairman); Joe Burns (Chief Executive Officer)
- Products: Uncrewed aerial systems (drones); Avionics systems; Pilot training services; Electric air mobility aircraft
- Divisions: Drones; Avionics; Training; Electric Air Mobility
- Subsidiaries: Aspen Avionics; Sky-Watch; Jaunt Air Mobility; Coastal Defense; Agile Defense
- Website: theairogroup.com

The AIRO Group, also known as AIRO, is a US-based urban air mobility and drone ecosystem company founded in 2005. It is headquartered in the Greater Chicago Area. Chirinjeev Kathuria is the AIRO Group's executive chairman.

== History and expansion ==
AIRO is a multi-faceted air mobility, autonomy, and aerospace company focusing on urban air mobility and drone ecosystems. It was founded in 2005 to operate AIRO Drone and Agile Defense. It was established as an air drones base company.

In 2021, AIRO acquired Aspen Avionics and proceeded with a merger with Coastal Defense. On October 6, 2021, Jaunt Air Mobility entered into a merger with the AIRO group. AIRO's subsidiary, Jaunt Air Mobility, advanced to the next phase of the AFWERX High-Speed Vertical Take-Off and Landing Concept Challenge for the United States Air Force and United States Special Operations Command.

AIRO confidentially submitted a draft registration statement on Form S-1 with the Securities and Exchange Commission relating to the proposed initial public offering of its common stock.

== Description ==
The company works over commercial, military, robotics, crewed/uncrewed aerial systems, and multi-modal aircraft and avionics systems. Other domains of this company include cargo transport and training. It addresses the entire drone ecosystem.

It has seven aerospace companies as its subsidiaries: AIRO Drone and Sky-Watch for commercial drones, Aspen Avionics for Advanced Avionics, Agile Defense and Coastal Defense for training, Jaunt Air Mobility for electric air mobility, and Aironet.

== Team ==
Chirinjeev Kathuria is the AIRO group's executive chairman. Joe Burns serves as the chief executive officer of AIRO Drone and of Agile Defense; John Uczekaj is the president and chief executive officer of Aspen Avionics; Martin Schousboe is the chief executive officer of Sky-Watch; Pramod Raheja is the founder and chief executive officer of Airgility; Kyle Stanbro is the founder and president of Coastal Defense; Martin Peryea is the chief executive officer and chief technology officer of Jaunt Air Mobility.

Călin Rovinescu, the former president and chief executive officer of Air Canada, and Mitch Garber, a global technology and growth capital investor, are investors and advisors for Jaunt Air Mobility.

== Partnerships ==
AIRO partnered with Stantec GenerationAV on June 24, 2021, to work on UAS aerial and autonomous platform solutions. Jaunt Air Mobility is working with L&T Technology Services Limited as an essential engineering partner. Jaunt Air Mobility advanced to the next phase of the AFWERX High-Speed Vertical Take-Off and Landing Concept Challenge for the United States Air Force and United States Special Operations Command.
