= Chernyshev (crater) =

Lunar impact crater

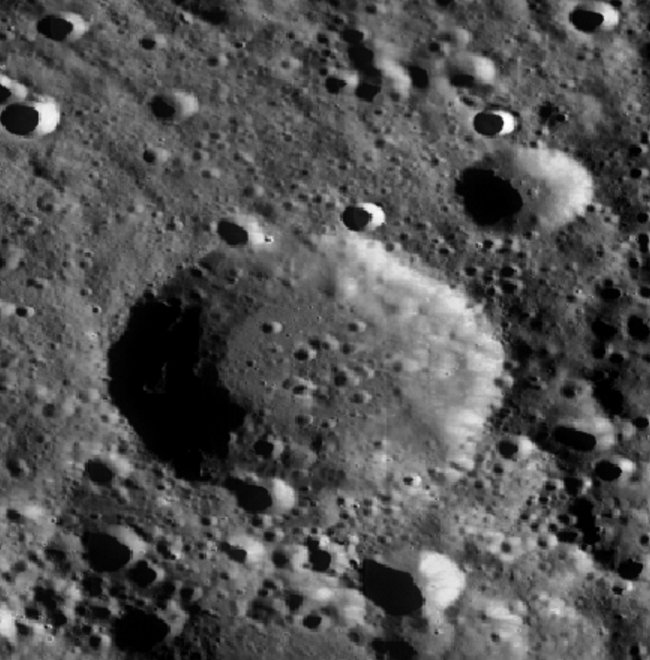
- LRO WAC image
- Coordinates: 47.3°N 174.2°E
- Diameter: 59.31 km (36.85 mi)
- Depth: Unknown
- Colongitude: 186° at sunrise
- Eponym: Nikolai Chernyshev

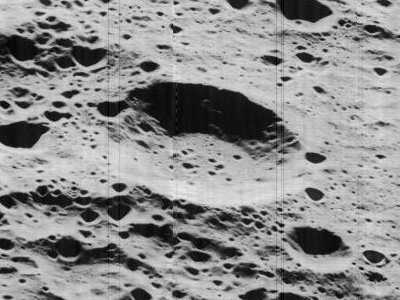
Oblique Lunar Orbiter 5 image, facing west

Chernyshev is a lunar impact crater that is located in the northern part of the Moon's far side. It lies to the northeast of the crater Chandler, and to the southeast of D'Alembert, a walled plain.

The rim of this crater has been worn by impacts, and multiple tiny craters lie along the rim. The southern part of the rim in particular has been more heavily eroded and modified by impacts compared to the northern part of the perimeter. The interior floor is more heavily impacted in the eastern half when compared to the west, although even the later region is not free of small impacts. The floor is otherwise relatively level and lacks a central peak or significant ridges.

In 1966, this crater was named after Soviet rocket scientist Nikolai Chernyshev (1906–1963) by the Academy of Sciences of the Soviet Union. Its designation was formally adopted by the International Astronomical Union in 1970.

== Satellite craters ==
By convention these features are identified on lunar maps by placing the letter on the side of the crater midpoint that is closest to Chernyshev.

Chernyshev	Latitude	Longitude	Diameter
B	48.5° N	175.7° E	20 km
