= Chandler (crater) =

Lunar impact crater

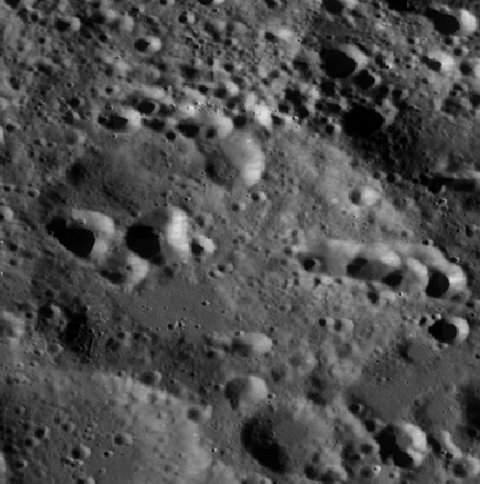
- LRO WAC image
- Coordinates: 43.65°N 171.76°E
- Diameter: 88.60 km (55.05 mi)
- Depth: Unknown
- Colongitude: 190° at sunrise
- Eponym: Seth C. Chandler

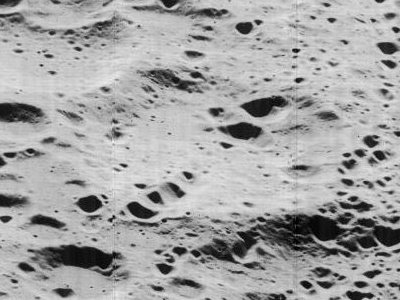
Oblique Lunar Orbiter 5 image, facing west

Chandler is a heavily degraded lunar impact crater in the northern hemisphere, on the Moon's far side. It lies to the southeast of the large walled plain named D'Alembert, and southeast of the slightly smaller Chernyshev crater.

This is a heavily worn and eroded crater that is now essentially a wide, irregular depression in the rugged lunar surface. It lies among the outer ejecta blanket of D'Alembert. Attached to the outer south-southwest rim is the slightly smaller but equally worn Chandler P. Multiple small craters lie along the rim and inner wall of Chandler, but the northern part of the rim has been nearly obliterated by a cluster of small impacts. There is also seemingly a chain of impacts that run across the crater midpoint, with a double impact in the western half and a chain of three impacts in the eastern half. The remainder of the floor is somewhat irregular, with multiple tiny craters and a pair of small impacts near the southern rim.

This crater is named after American astronomer Seth C. Chandler (1846–1913). Prior to formal naming by the IAU in 1970, Chandler was called Crater 66. Chandler P crater was called Crater 64, and an unnamed crater to the northeast of Chandler was called Crater 68.

== Satellite craters ==
By convention, these features are identified on lunar maps by placing the letter on the side of the crater midpoint that is closest to Chandler.

Chandler	Latitude	Longitude	Diameter
G	43.3° N	175.8° E	33 km
P	41.7° N	170.3° E	67 km
Q	41.2° N	169.2° E	16 km
U	45.5° N	166.7° E	14 km
