= Ocean Biomedical =

Biopharmaceutical company

- Industry: Pharmaceutical
- Founder: Chirinjeev Kathuria
- Headquarters: Providence, Rhode Island, United States
- Products: Malaria vaccine and others
- Website: oceanbiomedical.com

Ocean Biomedical is a new-generation American biopharmaceutical company based in Providence, Rhode Island. The company has product candidates addressing malaria, pulmonary fibrosis, and lung cancer. Ocean Biomedical was founded by Indian-American physician Chirinjeev Kathuria with Scientific Co-founders Jack Elias and Dr. Jonathan Kurtis, both from Brown University’s Medical School faculty. They aim to build a pipeline of preclinical, clinical, and commercial drug development by bringing together interdisciplinary expertise and resources.

== History ==
In January 2019 Chirinjeev Kathuria co-founded Ocean Biomedical in Rhode Island, United States. The company was also co-founded by Jack Elias, who was Dean of Medicine at Brown University at the time, but currently works as a senior health advisor at Brown. Ocean Biomedical started off as a Brown University biotech "spin-off." The biopharmaceutical company is currently based in Province, Rhode Island. As of 2021 the CEO of the company is Elizabeth Ng. The company works with scientists and research institutions around the world on the research and development projects for new medicines.

In 2021 Ocean Biomedical announced plans to go public and filed for a $100 million, the only known investor is Alan Mendosa Campos.

== Areas ==
Ocean Biomedical has worked in areas such as non-small cell lung cancer and pulmonary fibrosis.

== Vaccines ==
Ocean Biomedical has worked on developing vaccines for tropical diseases such as malaria, as well as for emerging diseases like COVID-19. In 2020, the company announced the discovery of a malaria vaccine.

== Affiliations and partnerships ==
Ocean Biomedical also has partnered with scientists such as:

- Jack Elias (Dean of Biology and Medicine of Brown University's Alpert Medical School)
- Jake Kurtis (Chair of Pathology and Laboratory Medicine, Brown University)

Scientific advisors include Roy Herbst, Wafik el-Deiry, Erol Fikrig, and William H. Koster.
