= Terry Wong =

Canadian aviator

Lieutenant Colonel Terry Wong, a former helicopter pilot with the Canadian Forces, was slated to become the next Canadian astronaut, with the private firm Canadian Arrow. As of 2021, Wong is Branch Head for Doctrine Development at the RCAF Aerospace Warfare Centre

He received his pilot's license at the age of 17, and would go on to become a commercial pilot, an instructor on military jets and was a Canadian Armed Forces pilot based at CFB Borden, flying Griffons in the 400 Tactical Helicopter Squadron. Wong also holds a Masters of Engineering degree. He is currently a Lieutenant Colonel with 16 Wing, CFB Borden, an air command training centre.
