= Project VR-190 =

Planned Soviet space project

VR-190 (Russian: ВР-190; Vysotnaya Raketa, literally, high-altitude rocket) was the USSR's first rocket project designed to launch a human into suborbital space flight on a ballistic trajectory. The project ran in the 1940s and 1950s and, according to official sources, did not achieve its set goals. However, conspiracy theories surrounding the project claim that although crewed flights officially failed, cosmonauts were successfully sent into space in the 1950s.

== History ==
=== Origins ===
On 13 May 1946, according to a secret decree by the Soviet Government, large-scale rocket research was established in the USSR. The official establishment of the rocket industry was preceded by a working group run by Mikhail Tikhonravov and Nikolai Chernyshev at the NII-4 in the Academy of Artillery Science. In the autumn of 1945, the group ran its own stratospheric rocket programme, which culminated in the development of the VR-190, a rocket system for vertical flight for two pilots up to an altitude of 200 km based on captured German V-2 (A-4) rockets.

In February 1946, the project was presented to the Secretary of the USSR Academy of Sciences, N. G. Bruevich, and then to the Academy's president Sergey Vavilov in March. Positively received, the project was introduced to the Minister of the aviation industry, Mikhail Khrunichev, in June.

=== Testing and development ===
Testing of uncrewed and crewed flights was conducted at Kapustin Yar in the Astrakhan region. The test flights were reported to have lasted about 20 minutes during which the rocket reached a height of more than 100 km (Kármán line) in the upper atmosphere, with their payloads separating from the warheads. All pilots descended back using parachutes and landed a few kilometers from the launch site.

The VR-190 project was implemented at roughly same time, with high-altitude rockets with sealed warheads and life-support systems being tested. They also conducted flights with animal passengers in order to assess the combined effects of various factors that could also affect human passengers. Several suborbital flights with dogs were carried out: with R-1B and R-1V rockets (1951) - when dogs Dezik and Roma were the first animals in history to successfully complete sub-orbital spaceflight - with R-1D and R-1E rockets (1954-1957), R-1E rockets (1957-1960) and R-2A and R-5A rockets.

According to official accounts, the project never reached the stage of human flight, and was canceled due to the lack of success in the late 1950s. Work refocused on creating the orbital crewed capsule Vostok.

The project was strictly kept secret, with designers, scientists, and even the dogs operating under pseudonyms. The first public information on the project became available in the 1980s and was of a purely theoretical nature. Its practical implementation and the first flight of the dogs on rockets was officially disclosed in 1991.

== See also ==
- Point-to-point sub-orbital spaceflight
- Orbital spaceflight
- Spaceflight
- Spaceport
- List of rocket launch sites
- Office of Commercial Space Transportation
- Canadian Arrow
- Supersonic Transport
- XCOR Lynx
- Rocketplane XP
- DH-1 (rocket)
- McDonnell Douglas DC-X
- Interorbital Systems
- Quad (rocket)
- Lunar Lander Challenge
- Reusable Vehicle Testing program by JAXA
- Project Morpheus NASA program to continue developing ALHAT and Quad landers
