= Kazanskaya, Krasnodar Krai =

Kazanskaya Казанская
- Stanitsa
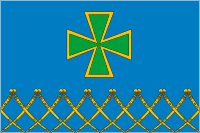
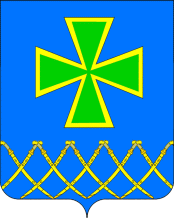
- Flag Coat of arms
- Interactive map of Kazanskaya
- Location of Kazanskaya Kazanskaya (Krasnodar Krai)
- Coordinates: 45°24′21″N 40°25′42″E
- Country: Russia
- Federal subject: Krasnodar Krai
- Founded: 1802
- Elevation: 121 m (397 ft)

Population (2010 Census)
  - Total: 10,991
  - Estimate (2023): 11,170 (+1.6%)

Administrative status
  - Subordinated to: Kavkazsky District
- Time zone: UTC+3 (MSK)
- Postal code: 352147
- OKTMO ID: 03618413101

Kazanskaya (Russian: Казанская) is a stanitsa in Kavkazsky District of Krasnodar Krai, Russia. It is located on the Kuban River. Population: 10,991 (2010 census);
