= PlanetSpace =

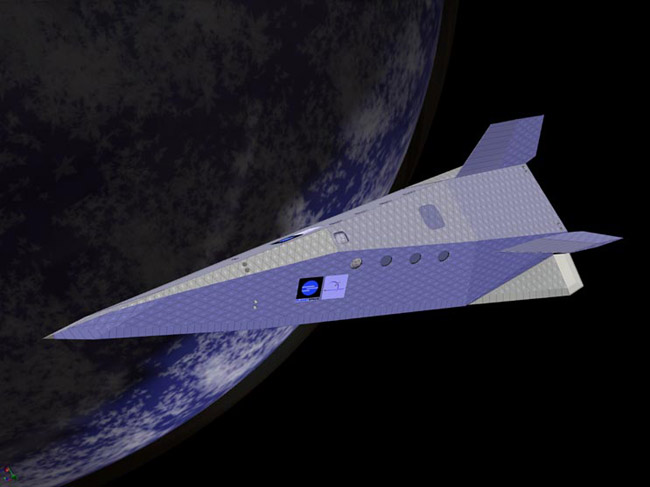
- The proposed Silver Dart spacecraft.
- Type: Corporation
- Industry: Aerospace
- Founded: 2005
- Defunct: 2013
- Headquarters: Chicago, United States of America
- Area served: North America
- Key people: Chirinjeev Kathuria, and Geoff Sheerin
- Products: Rockets, Spacecraft
- Services: Tourism, Space Station servicing, and crew rotation

PlanetSpace was a privately funded Chicago-based rocket and space travel project founded by Geoff Sheerin, CEO of the Canadian Arrow corporation. The owner was Dr. Chirinjeev Kathuria.

In February, 2007, NASA announced plans to provide PlanetSpace with requirements and specifications to provide crew and cargo flights to the International Space Station under the terms of the National Aeronautics and Space Act. Initially, PlanetSpace planned to use the Silver Dart for this purpose, but on 21 November 2007 PlanetSpace announced its COTS proposal would use a spacecraft provided by Lockheed Martin. This proposal did not include use of the Silver Dart.

Planetspace is not in business as its corporate status was revoked by Canadian government due to non-compliance with filing requirements. Its last annual meeting was held in 2010 and no filings since then.

== Background ==
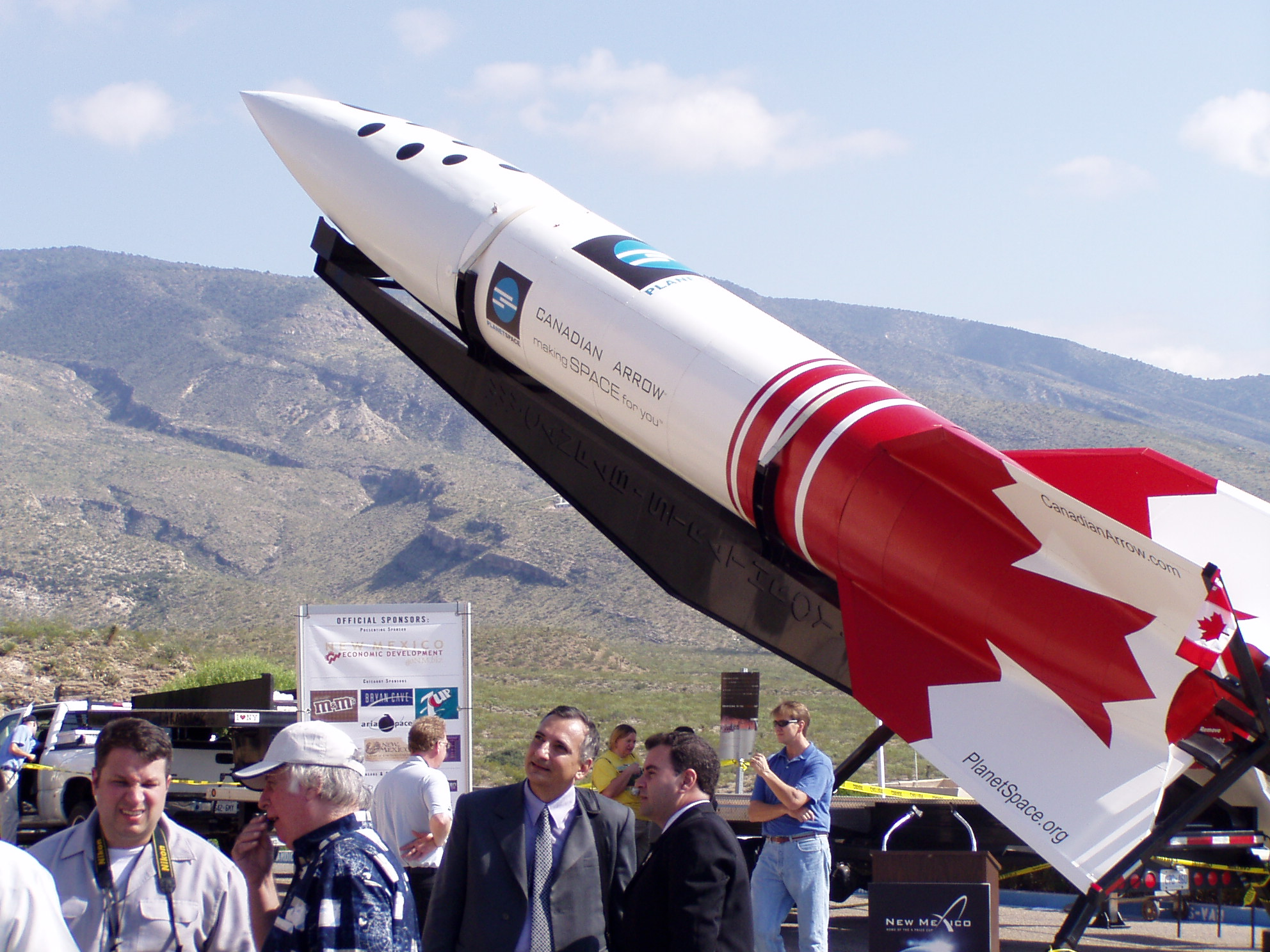
Mockup of the Canadian Arrow rocket.

The mission of PlanetSpace was to make space travel accessible to the general public. The company focused its main efforts on two major projects: the Canadian Arrow, and the Silver Dart, which was a proposed orbital spaceplane.

Geoff Sheerin, President of Canadian Arrow and Dr. Chirinjeev Kathuria, two entrepreneurs with a love of space, joined forces to create PLANETSPACE in the spring of 2005. At a press conference in May 2005 in London Ontario Canada, Sheerin told the United Press International that Canadian Arrow was nearing completion and that it was missing only one important component in its plan to develop its space tourism business: money. Geoff Sheerin proudly announced, "We have found our Paul Allen", presenting the newly formed company PlanetSpace and his new partner Dr.Chirinjeev Kathuria.

Dr. Kathuria was a founding director of MirCorp, the company that made history on April 4, 2000, when it launched the world's first privately funded crewed space program and signed up Dennis Tito to space as Earth's first space tourist or citizen explorer. MirCorp was a joint venture with RSC Energia. RSC Energia launched the first satellite (Sputnik), sent the first man to orbit the Earth (Yuri Gagarin) and built the Mir Space Station. It is a major partner in the International Space Station.

In 2009, the company filed protest with the Government Accountability Office against competition in space.

== Canadian Arrow ==
The Canadian Arrow was a 16.5 m tall two-stage rocket, where the second stage was a three-person space capsule. In a somewhat conservative approach, the design of the rocket engine and aerodynamics were based on the well proven V-2 design from World War II. The vehicle was planned to launch vertically from the ground, on a sub-orbital trajectory, and return to Earth via parachutes and make a water landing, similar to the splashdowns of the Mercury, Gemini and Apollo spacecraft.

== Silver Dart ==
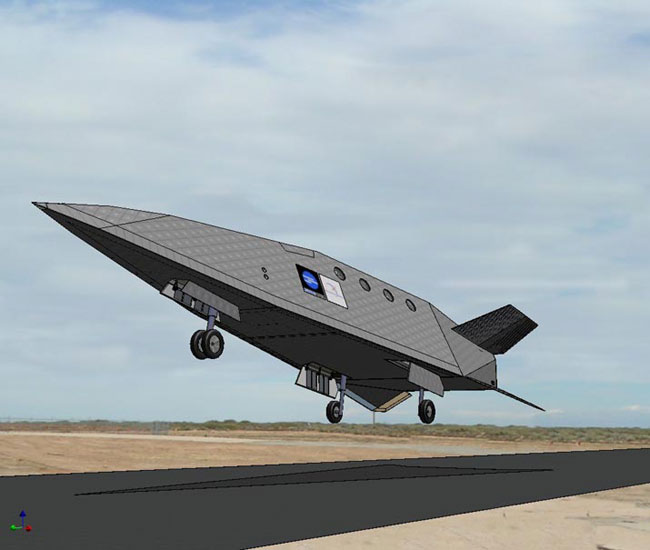
The proposed Silver Dart spacecraft.

Based on the FDL-7, a lifting body aircraft designed for near earth orbital flight by the US Airforce Flight Dynamics Laboratory, the Silver Dart was a lifting body concept designed to glide from hypersonic speeds of Mach 22 down to landing. The goal was to develop an orbital space craft/hypersonic glider capable of carrying around eight passengers. The spacecraft was expected to launch vertically atop a two-stage-plus-boosters rocket, propelled at takeoff by 28 Canadian Arrow rocket engines (slightly updated replicas of the German V-2 engine) and land horizontally on an aircraft runway, in an arrangement reminiscent of the Dynasoar project by NASA.

NASA based its Martin Marietta X-24B test aircraft on the FDL-7 lifting body, and valued the added range and stability of the sleek, sharp-nosed design. FDL-7's lifting body design was projected to be able to give the Silver Dart about twice the lift coefficient of NASA's space shuttles at subsonic speeds. The design was expected to have a higher glide and cross range than the Shuttle Orbiter, since it was designed with a 4,000 mile cross range. The ship was intended to use a metal skin that would be more resistant to weather conditions than the Space Shuttle. PlanetSpace planned for an initial demonstration flight in 2009.

== Athena III ==
In early 2008 PlanetSpace proposed the Athena III launch vehicle, a 2.8-million-pound-thrust ISS resupply rocket, to NASA under the phase 2 rebid of the Commercial Orbital Transportation Services (COTS) program. The Space Shuttle Solid Rocket Booster (SRB) derived rocket was to feature 2 1/2 segments from the SRB, and was to be realized in a joint venture with Lockheed Martin and Alliant Techsystems (ATK).

The PlanetSpace proposal was not accepted for NASA funding. On February 19, 2008, the second round award was made to Orbital Sciences Corporation, for the Cygnus spacecraft. NASA's selection statement showed that Orbital beat PlanetSpace on funding concerns.

In October 2008, PlanetSpace, Lockheed Martin and ATK teamed up with Boeing and the State of Florida to obtain private financing for the project outside the NASA funding they did not obtain.

== Dissolved for non-compliance ==
PlanetSpace had its incorporated status revoked by the Canadian government for non-compliance under section 212 of the Canadian Business Corporations Act on 6 February 2013. The government's documents showed that PlanetSpace's last annual meeting occurred in 2010, and that was also the last time the corporation reported its annual filings.
