= Yubileyny, Totemsky District, Vologda Oblast =

Yubileyny Юбилейный
- Village
- Location within Vologda Oblast Location within Russia
- Coordinates: 59°40′N 42°03′E
- Country: Russia
- Region: Vologda Oblast
- District: Totemsky District
- Time zone: UTC+3:00

Yubileyny (Russian: Юбилейный) is a rural locality (a village) in Pogorelovskoye Rural Settlement, Totemsky District, Vologda Oblast, Russia. The population was 1,658 as of 2002. There are 22 streets.

== Geography ==
Yubileyny is located 65 km southwest of Totma (the district's administrative centre) by road. Toporikha is the nearest rural locality.
