= Yubileyny, Ustyuzhensky District, Vologda Oblast =

Yubileyny Юбилейный
- Settlement
- Location within Vologda Oblast Location within Russia
- Coordinates: 58°49′N 36°25′E
- Country: Russia
- Region: Vologda Oblast
- District: Ustyuzhensky District
- Time zone: UTC+3:00

Yubileyny (Russian: Юбилейный) is a rural locality (a settlement) in Ustyuzhenskoye Rural Settlement, Ustyuzhensky District, Vologda Oblast, Russia. The population was 412 as of 2002. There are 19 streets.

== Geography ==
Yubileyny is located 2 km (1.2 mi) southwest of Ustyuzhna (the district's administrative centre) by road. Ustyuzhna is the nearest rural locality.
