= Yubileyny, Gremyachinsk, Perm Krai =

Yubileyny Юбилейный
- Settlement
- Location within Perm Krai Location within Russia
- Coordinates: 58°46′N 57°46′E
- Country: Russia
- Region: Perm Krai
- District: Gremyachinsky Urban okrug
- Time zone: UTC+5:00

Yubileyny (Russian: Юбилейный) is a rural locality (a settlement) in Gremyachinsky Urban okrug, Perm Krai, Russia. The population was 1,275 as of 2010. There are 12 streets.
