= Tom Roeser =

American writer and broadcaster (1928-2011)

Thomas F. Roeser (July 23, 1928 – May 29, 2011) was a Chicago-based conservative writer and broadcaster, who broadcast for many years on WLS 890 AM talk radio. He also was the founder and former chairman of the editorial board of a Chicago Internet newspaper, The Chicago Daily Observer, as well as a lecturer, teacher and former vice president of the Quaker Oats Company.

== Early life and education ==
Roeser was born in Evanston, Illinois on July 23, 1928 and graduated from Saint Juliana elementary school and the William Howard Taft High School in Chicago. He graduated from Saint John's University (Minnesota) in Collegeville, Minnesota with a bachelor's in English literature. He continued his education in graduate studies at DePaul (English), Loyola University of Chicago (political science) and Harvard University (political science). He was a former John F. Kennedy Fellow at Harvard University and a fellow with the Woodrow Wilson National Fellowship Foundation based in Princeton, New Jersey.

== Professional career ==
In 1953, after a short time spent in the advertising agency business in Chicago, Roeser moved to Minnesota to become the city editor of the Saint Cloud Daily Times, serving also as a stringer for the Associated Press. He was named director of research and news-information for the Minnesota Republican party in 1955, where he stayed until 1958, supervising the party's communications program, including media coverage and advertising. In 1958, he was named press secretary to a newly elected Republican congressman, Rep. Albert H. Quie of Minnesota. The following year, he also served as press secretary to Rep. Walter H. Judd of Minnesota, then the ranking Republican on the United States House Committee on Foreign Affairs.

In 1960, with election of a Republican governor of Minnesota, Elmer L. Andersen, Roeser was appointed news secretary and supervised news dissemination for state government. At the completion of Andersen's term, Roeser returned to the Minnesota Republican party in an enhanced role: Director of Communications, where he served from 1963 to 1964 when he left to return to Chicago to initiate a program of public affairs and government relations, as well as community relations for The Quaker Oats Company.

Roeser launched Quaker's government relations program as well as its urban affairs program in the inner city of Chicago and at plant locations throughout the company. He remained in this position with Quaker Oats until 1969 when he was recruited by the Nixon administration as an assistant to the United States Secretary of Commerce to begin a new federal program involving aid to minority business enterprises. He formed the nation's first program to assist minority business (now the Minority Business Development Agency). In 1970 in a dispute with the Nixon administration which, he felt, was not serious about the program, he recommended the abolition of his own agency. This was highly unpopular and he was let go by the administration, which then appointed him as the director of public affairs and Congressional relations for the Peace Corps. As a foreign service officer, he managed the agency's worldwide communications and advertising program until The Quaker Oats Company requested he return — which he did in 1971 — after which he became its vice president of government relations.

He became the first corporate lobbyist to be an appointed Fellow of the John F. Kennedy School of Government, serving in its Institute of Politics, where he taught in addition to continuing his role — on leave — at Quaker. Shortly thereafter, he was named a Woodrow Wilson International Fellow in Princeton, New Jersey. Upon returning to Chicago to resume full-time duties at Quaker, he also taught after hours at the Wharton School of Finance, University of Pennsylvania; the Kellogg School, Northwestern University; Loyola, University of Chicago; DePaul University; the University of Illinois-Chicago, and Saint John's College, Oxford. While continuing his work at Quaker, he also became an op-ed writer for The Chicago Sun-Times, following which he wrote for The Chicago Tribune and wrote op-eds for The Wall Street Journal.

== Political work ==
Long active in Chicago civic, religious and political life, Roeser was a founder of Project LEAP (Legal Elections in All Precincts), the city's anti-vote-fraud organization, was president of the City Club of Chicago for seventeen years and its chairman; was chairman, founder of the Republican Assembly of Illinois, an organization of grassroots conservative Republicans, and a co-founder of Catholic Citizens of Illinois. He was a member of the Fellowship of Catholic Scholars, a board member of the Howard Center, Rockford and program chairman of Legatus (Chicago), an organization of Catholic CEOs and was vice chairman of Haymarket Center, Chicago, a leading rehabilitation center for victims of alcohol and substance abuse.

== Broadcasting career ==
Roeser began hosting a talk show on WLS-AM in Chicago in 1994. He began on a fill-in basis, substituting for Ed Vrdolyak alongside Ty Wansley. Vrdolyak quit the show in May 1994, and then, after Illinois Lieutenant Governor Bob Kustra first agreed to take the radio host job replacing Vrdolyk and then decided against it in August 1994, Roeser again began hosting alongside Wansley. He retired on May 21, 2011. He was a member of the American Federation of Television and Radio Artists (AFTRA), which is affiliated with the AFL-CIO.

== Writing ==
Roeser authored the book Father Mac: The Life and Times of Ignatius D. McDermott, co-founder of Chicago's famed Haymarket Center. His Op Ed columns appeared in the Chicago Sun-Times, Chicago Tribune and The Wall Street Journal. He was Chicago correspondent for The Wanderer, the oldest national Catholic weekly in the United States and wrote on his own blog, blog.tomroeser.com. In addition to hosting his own talk radio program, "Political Shootout" on WLS-AM, Chicago, he appeared as a commentator on The MacNeil-Lehrer NewsHour on PBS, on BBC and often on Chicago Tonight on WTTW-TV Chicago Public Radio and on Inside Politics on WBEZ Chicago public radio. In addition, he was an occasional guest on Beyond the Beltway with Bruce DuMont, a coast-to-coast television and radio program broadcast weekly.

== Teaching ==
His teaching career included service as adjunct professor of public policy at the Wharton School of Finance, University of Pennsylvania; the Kellogg School of Management, Northwestern University; Loyola University of Chicago; DePaul University of Chicago; the University of Illinois-Chicago; Roosevelt University of Chicago and Saint John's College, Oxford University.

== Personal ==
Roeser was married from 1959 until his death to the former Lillian Prescott of Chicago. The couple were parents of four grown children, two sons (Thomas F., Jr. and Michael J.) and two daughters (Mary Catherine Magnor and Jeanne Roeser) and is grandfather to 13. In 1988 he and Mrs. Roeser were named by Pope John Paul II as Knight and Lady of the Equestrian Order of the Holy Sepulchre of Jerusalem, a Roman Catholic charitable order.

== Death ==
On Sunday, May 29, 2011, Roeser died after a short illness. Fellow talk-show host Dan Proft told the Arlington Heights Daily Herald that Roeser had died of congestive heart failure.

Thomas F. Roeser was posthumously inducted into the William Howard Taft High School Alumni Association Hall of Fame in Chicago, Illinois in March 2013.
