= Yubileyny, Republic of Buryatia =

Yubileyny Юбилейный
- Settlement
- Location within Republic of Buryatia Location within Russia
- Coordinates: 53°43′N 110°14′E
- Country: Russia
- Region: Republic of Buryatia
- District: Barguzinsky District
- Time zone: UTC+8:00

Yubileyny (Russian: Юбилейный) is a rural locality (a settlement) and the administrative centre of Yubileynoye Rural Settlement, Barguzinsky District, Republic of Buryatia, Russia. The population was 765 as of 2017. There are 6 streets.

== Geography ==
Yubileyny is located 60 km northeast of Barguzin (the district's administrative centre) by road. Bayangol is the nearest rural locality.
