= Yubileyny, Kursk Oblast =

Rural locality in Kursk Oblast, Russia

Yubileyny Юбилейный
- Settlement
- Interactive map of Yubileyny
- Location of Yubileyny Yubileyny (Kursk Oblast)
- Coordinates: 51°46′10″N 36°15′46″E
- Country: Russia
- Federal subject: Kursk Oblast
- Administrative district: Kursky District
- SelsovietSelsoviet: Shchetinsky

Population (2010 Census)
  - Total: 1,702
  - Estimate (2010): 1,702 (0%)

Municipal status
  - Municipal district: Kursky Municipal District
  - Rural settlement: Shchetinsky Selsoviet Rural Settlement
- Time zone: UTC+3 (MSK)
- Postal code: 305511
- Dialing code: +7 4712
- OKTMO ID: 38620492141
- Website: shetin.rkursk.ru

Yubileyny (Russian: Юбилейный) is a rural locality (a settlement) in Shchetinsky Selsoviet Rural Settlement, Kursky District, Kursk Oblast, Russia. Population: 1,702 (2010 census); 1,619 (2002 census);

== Geography ==
The settlement is located 98 km from the Russia–Ukraine border, at the north-eastern border of the district center – the town Kursk, 2 km from the selsoviet center – Shchetinka.

Streets

There are the following streets in the locality: Aviatsionnaya, Ilyicha, Kurskaya, Molodyozhnaya, Molodyozhnaya Vtoraya, Molodyozhnaya Tretya, Rossyskaya, Tsvetochnaya and Tsvetochnaya Vtoraya (525 houses).

Climate

Yubileyny has a warm-summer humid continental climate (Dfb in the Köppen climate classification).

Climate data for Yubileyny
Month	Jan	Feb	Mar	Apr	May	Jun	Jul	Aug	Sep	Oct	Nov	Dec	Year
Mean daily maximum °C (°F)	−4.3 (24.3)	−3.4 (25.9)	2.5 (36.5)	12.9 (55.2)	19.3 (66.7)	22.6 (72.7)	25.3 (77.5)	24.6 (76.3)	18 (64)	10.4 (50.7)	3.2 (37.8)	−1.4 (29.5)	10.8 (51.4)
Daily mean °C (°F)	−6.4 (20.5)	−5.9 (21.4)	−1.1 (30.0)	8 (46)	14.6 (58.3)	18.3 (64.9)	20.9 (69.6)	19.9 (67.8)	13.9 (57.0)	7.1 (44.8)	0.9 (33.6)	−3.3 (26.1)	7.2 (45.0)
Mean daily minimum °C (°F)	−8.9 (16.0)	−8.9 (16.0)	−5.1 (22.8)	2.5 (36.5)	8.9 (48.0)	12.9 (55.2)	15.8 (60.4)	14.8 (58.6)	9.6 (49.3)	3.8 (38.8)	−1.4 (29.5)	−5.5 (22.1)	3.2 (37.8)
Average precipitation mm (inches)	51 (2.0)	44 (1.7)	47 (1.9)	50 (2.0)	60 (2.4)	68 (2.7)	70 (2.8)	55 (2.2)	59 (2.3)	59 (2.3)	46 (1.8)	48 (1.9)	657 (26)
Source: https://en.climate-data.org/asia/russian-federation/kursk-oblast/юбилеиныи-319131/

== Transport ==
Yubileyny is located 5 km from the federal route P-298 (Kursk – Voronezh – P-22 "Kaspy" Highway; a part of the European route E38), 1.5 km from the road of regional importance 38K-018 (Kursk – Ponyri), on the road 38K-016 (Kursk – Kastornoye), in the vicinity of the railway halt 4 km (railway line Kursk – 146 km).

The rural locality is situated 2.5 km from Kursk Vostochny Airport, 125 km from Belgorod International Airport and 204 km from Voronezh Peter the Great Airport.
