= Yubileynoye, Amur Oblast =

Yubileynoye Юбилейное
- Selo
- Location within Amur Oblast Location within Russia
- Coordinates: 51°32′N 128°50′E
- Country: Russia
- Region: Amur Oblast
- District: Mazanovsky District
- Time zone: UTC+9:00

Yubileynoye (Russian: Юбилейное) is a rural locality (a selo) in Beloyarovsky Selsoviet of Mazanovsky District, Amur Oblast, Russia. The population was 90 as of 2018. There are 3 streets.

== Geography ==
Yubileynoye is located on the left bank of the Kamenushka River, 18 km south of Novokiyevsky Uval (the district's administrative centre) by road. Khristinovka is the nearest rural locality.
