= Yubileyny, Zabaykalsky Krai =

Yubileyny Юбилейный
- Settlement
- Location within Zabaykalsky Krai Location within Russia
- Coordinates: 50°16′N 118°21′E
- Country: Russia
- Region: Zabaykalsky Krai
- District: Krasnokamensky District
- Time zone: UTC+9:00

Yubileyny (Russian: Юбилейный) is a rural locality (a settlement) in Krasnokamensky District, Zabaykalsky Krai, Russia. Population: 471 (2021 census); 642 (2010 census); 774 (2002 census); There are 10 streets in this selo.

== Geography ==
This rural locality is located 30 km from Krasnokamensk (the district's administrative centre), 397 km from Chita (capital of Zabaykalsky Krai) and 5,771 km from Moscow. Ust-Tasurkay is the nearest rural locality.
