= Yubileynoye, Republic of Dagestan =

Yubileynoye Юбилейное
- Selo
- Location within Republic of Dagestan Location within Russia
- Coordinates: 43°52′N 46°43′E
- Country: Russia
- Region: Republic of Dagestan
- District: Kizlyarsky District
- Time zone: UTC+3:00

Yubileynoye (Russian: Юбилейное) is a rural locality (a selo) and the administrative centre of Kizlyarsky Selsoviet, Kizlyarsky District, Republic of Dagestan, Russia. The population was 777 as of 2010. There are 31 streets.

== Geography ==
It is located 2 km northeast of Kizlyar.

== Nationalities ==
Russians, Avars, Dargins, Armenians and Azerbaijanis live there.
