= Chirinjeev Kathuria =

Indian-American businessperson

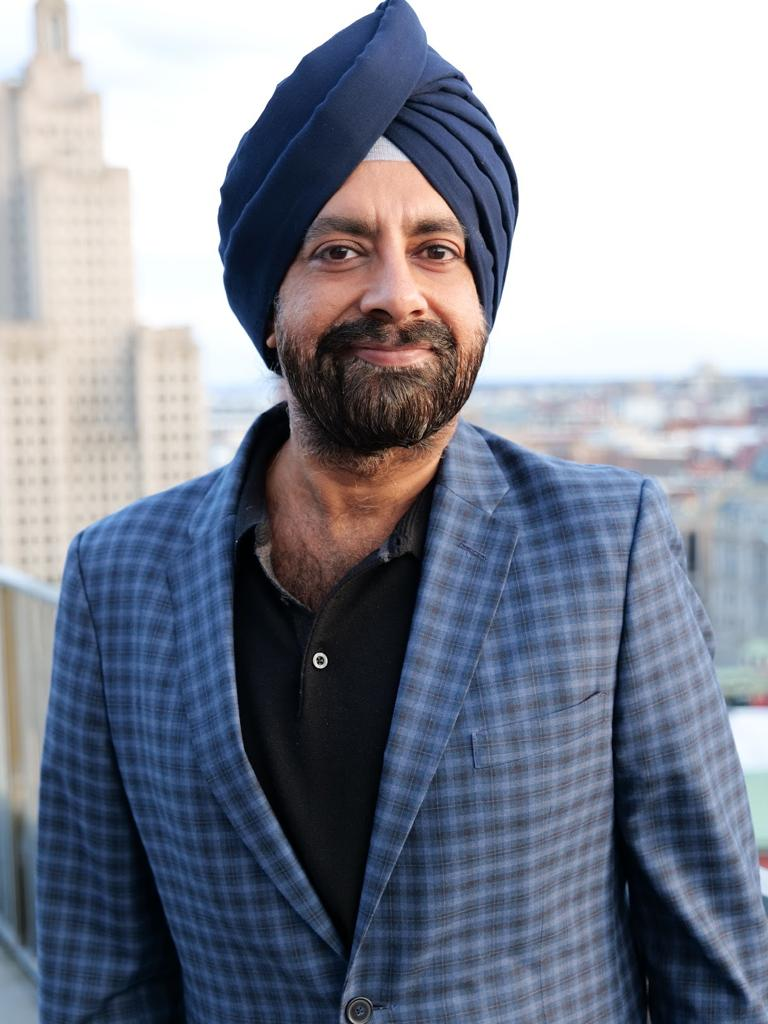
- Born: New Delhi, India
- Education: Brown University; Stanford University
- Known for: First Indian American to run for the US Senate, Co-founder of PlanetSpace and New Generation Power International, co-founder and co-chairman of UpHealth Inc., executive chairman and co-founder of Ocean Biomedical Inc.; Co-founder and chairman of the AIRO Group

Chirinjeev Kathuria is an Indian-American investor, physician, politician, businessperson, and philanthropist. He was the first Indian-American to run for the U.S. Senate.

Kathuria was the co-founder and co-chairman of UpHealth Inc. which went public on the NYSE (NYSE:UPH). The company focused on digital care management, telehealth, digital pharmacy and technology-enabled behavioral health. Kathuria is the executive chairman and co-founder of Ocean Biomedical Inc., a biotech company that partners with scientists and research institutions to accelerate the translation of new discoveries into medicines. He is also the co-founder and chairman of New Generation Power International, and co-founder of PlanetSpace. Additionally, Kathuria is the co-founder and chairman of the AIRO Group. The AIRO Group brings together technologies and services in urban air mobility, commercial and military aviation, and avionics. Airo Group Holdings, Inc. Announced a Confidential Submission of Draft Registration Statement Related to Proposed Public Offering.

In 2004, Kathuria was an unsuccessful candidate for the nomination for the United States Senate election in Illinois.

== Early life ==
Chirinjeev Kathuria was born in New Delhi, India and came with his parents to Chicago, Illinois at the age of eight months. Kathuria graduated Valedictorian from Downers Grove North High School. He received a Bachelor of Science and Doctorate of Medicine from Brown University and a Master of Business Administration from Stanford University.

== Career ==
=== Businessperson ===
Kathuria co-founded American Teleradiology NightHawks Inc., which was acquired in 2005 by NightHawk Radiology Holdings Inc.; the combined company went public on NASDAQ in 2006. In 2010 he co-founded New Generation Power International.

==== Space exploration ====
Kathuria has also been involved in space exploration, and was the Founding Director of MirCorp, the first commercial company to privately launch and fund crewed space programs. Kathuria also invested in Russia's Mir space station in its final days. In 2005, Chirinjeev Kathuria co-founded PlanetSpace, a privately funded Chicago-based rocket and space travel project, which bid for NASA's Commercial Resupply Services contract with Lockheed Martin, Boeing and Alliant Techsystems.

==== Biomedical ====
Kathuria co-founded Ocean Biomedical and serves as the chairman of its board of directors. Ocean Biomedical is currently pursuing programs in oncology, fibrosis, infectious disease, and inflammation.

He was also the co-founder and co-chairman of UpHealth Inc. which went public on the NYSE (NYSE:UPH).

==== Aerospace and defense ====
He founded AIRO Group in 2005, which 2021 acquired Aspen Avionics and proceeded with a merger with Coastal Defense. In the same year, Jaunt Air Mobility entered into a merger with the AIRO group.

=== Politician ===
In 2004, Kathuria was an unsuccessful candidate for the nomination for the United States Senate election in Illinois. Jack Ryan was the eventual primary winner. Democrat and future President Barack Obama went on to win the general election.
