= Yubileyny, Amur Oblast =

Yubileyny Юбилейный
- Settlement
- Location within Amur Oblast Location within Russia
- Coordinates: 53°07′N 127°21′E
- Country: Russia
- Region: Amur Oblast
- District: Zeysky District
- Time zone: UTC+9:00

Yubileyny (Russian: Юбилейный) is a rural locality (a settlement) in Yubileyny Selsoviet of Zeysky District, Amur Oblast, Russia. The population was 432 as of 2018. There are 7 streets.

== Geography ==
Yubileyny is located on the left bank of the Zeya River, 103 km south of Zeya (the district's administrative centre) by road. Rublevka is the nearest rural locality.
