= Russian mystery fires =

Unusual fires and explosions since the 2022 Russian invasion of Ukraine

Location of mystery fires in Russia

A series of unusual fires and explosions have occurred in Russia since the invasion of Ukraine in February 2022, which have not been formally explained. There have been many notable arson attacks on military recruitment offices in Russia since the beginning of the war, and there has been speculation that some of the fires or explosions have been the result of sabotage efforts by Russian partisans (such as Svoboda Rossii or Atesh partisan legion) or Ukrainian saboteurs.

== Overview ==
A "yellow" (medium) terrorist threat level was introduced in Bryansk, Kursk, and Belgorod oblasts, as well as some districts of Voronezh Oblast, Krasnodar Krai, and northern Crimea. Starting from the end of March, a series of incidents and explosions were reported in border regions of Bryansk, Kursk, Belgorod, and Voronezh Oblasts. Russian officials reported mortar shelling, drone attacks, and helicopter gunship attacks allegedly coming "from the Ukrainian side". (Note: со стороны Украины, so storony Ukrainy)

The Ukrainian side refused to confirm or deny involvement in incidents at strategic locations. There were allegations that some of the fires or explosions were the result of Ukrainian sabotage.

In May, a series of incidents on railway lines in Russia impeded the deployment of troops and military equipment to Ukraine; responsibility for these incidents was claimed by the Internet movement "Stop the Wagons" (Note: Останови вагоны, Ostanovi vagony) (a reference to the Russian anti-war slogan "Stop the War"). (Note: Останови войну!, Ostanovi voinu!)

== List of reported fires ==
=== 2022 ===
Location	Date	Facility	Deaths	Coordinates
Kstovo	22 March 2022	Oil depot		
Belgorod	1 April 2022	Oil depot	1	50°35′29.8″N 36°40′13.1″E
Belgorod region	12 April 2022	Railway bridge		
Tver	21 April 2022	Central Research Institute of the Aerospace Defense Forces	7	
Kineshma	21 April 2022	Chemical plant		
Korolyov, Moscow Oblast	22 April 2022	Industrial zone where many enterprises of the space and rocket industry are located		
Barvikha	23 April 2022	Governor's residence in Moscow Region		
Bryansk	25 April 2022	Fuel depot holding 5,000 tonnes of fuel. 2nd Branch of Military Unit 55443–90.		
Ussuriysk	25 April 2022	Military air base		
Belgorod	27 April 2022	Ammunition depot		
Moscow	28 April 2022	Fires and explosions on Moscow's Kustanayskaya street		
Ilyinskoye	30 April 2022	GRES-2 power plant		52°1′26.3″N 75°28′34.5″E
Perm	1 May 2022	FKP gunpowder plant		
Moscow	3 May 2022	"Warehouse of a pro-Kremlin publishing house".		
Nizhny Novgorod	4 May 2022	Industrial zone		
Nizhnevartovsk	4 May 2022	Military enlistment office		
Kursk	5 May 2022	Unknown		
Perm	8 May 2022	Aviation college		
Dubovoye, Belgorod Oblast	11 May 2022	Unknown		
Teysin, Amursky district	12 May 2022	Military installation		
Berdsk	17 May 2022	Chemical plant		
Zhukovsky	21 May 2022	Fire at the substation in TsAGI (aviation institute)		
Moscow	24 May 2022	Saint Peter and Paul Church		
Moscow	3 June 2022	Grand Setun Plaza Building, business center with Pension Fund of Russia offices		
Komsomolsk-on-Amur	4 June 2022	Rosgvardia (National Guard of the Russian Federation) building		
Sarov, Nizhny Novgorod	8 June 2022	Rosatom (Nuclear) Institute of Digital Technologies		
Sergiyev Posad	8 June 2022	Zagorsk Optical-Mechanical Plant warehouse (optical, thermal & night-vision sighting systems)		
Vladivostok	8 June 2022	Military enlistment office		
Ust-Luga	10 June 2022	"Factor" timber terminal owned by oligarch Ramis Deberdeyev		
near Gulevka	11 June 2022	Druzhba pipeline		
Angarsk	23 June 2022	LPG station (liquefied petroleum gas station)	0	
Moscow	3 July 2022	Residential skyscraper		
near Moscow	3 August 2022	e-commerce warehouse	1	
Volokolamsk	12 September 2022	Plastic chip depot warehouse		
Novokuznetsk	26 September 2022	Steel plant owned by Putin ally Roman Abramovich	0	
Moscow	9 October 2022	Television and radio tower		
Belgorod	11 October 2022	Electricity substation		
Ryazan	21 October 2022	Gunpowder factory	16	
Saint Petersburg	26 October 2022	Warehouse	0	
Stalnoi Kon	16 November 2022	Oil depot	0	
near Saint Petersburg	19 November 2022	Gas pipeline	0	
Moscow	21 November 2022	Warehouse near three railway stations	5	
Angarsk	27 November 2022	Angarsk Petrochemical Plant (largest oil refinery in Russia)	0	
Surazh	29 November 2022	Oil storage tank	0	
Perm	30 November 2022	Thermal Power Plant #9 (roof of the turbine room)	0	
Khimki	9 December 2022	MEGA Khimki Shopping Centre, explosion and fire covering 18,000 square metres (190,000 sq ft)	1	55°54′40.1″N 37°23′47.1″E
Barnaul	9 December 2022	Tyre manufacturing plant	0	
Moscow	10 December 2022	Pushkin State Museum of Fine Arts	0	55°44′48.4″N 37°36′11.5″E
Balashikha	12 December 2022	Shopping center	0	55°43′31″N 37°59′14″E
Nizhnekamsk	12 December 2022	Synthetic rubber factory	0	
Saint Petersburg	13 December 2022	Machine-building plant	0	
Angarsk	15 December 2022	Angarsk Petrochemical Plant	2	
Vladivostok	17 December 2022	Confectionery factory warehouse	0	
Snezhinsk	18 December 2022	Shopping center	0	
Verkhnemarkovo, Irkutsk Oblast	18 December 2022	Oil and gas condensate field	0	57°20′14″N 107°03′09″E
Kalinino, Chuvashia	20 December 2022	Gas pipeline	3	
Kurgan	20 December 2022	Kamaz auto service center	0	
Murmansk	22 December 2022	Admiral Kuznetsov aircraft carrier	0	
Moscow	23 December 2022	Military base	0	
Murmansk	24 December 2022	Supply base	0	
Novosibirsk	26 December 2022	Warehouse		
Saint Petersburg	29 December 2022	Warehouse	0	
Kronstadt	30 December 2022	Oil tanker	0	
Rostov Nuclear Power Plant	31 December 2022	Transformer substation	1	

=== 2023 ===
Location	Date	Facility	Deaths	Coordinates
Novy Oskol	3 January 2023	Military facility		
Saint Petersburg	5 January 2023	Agricultural machinery plant	2	
Moscow	6 January 2023	Foreign Ministry	0	
Barnaul	8 January 2023	Shopping center	0	
Bratsk	9 January 2023	Military enlistment office	0	
Moscow	10 January 2023	Auto service	0	
Ust-Ilimsk, Irkutsk Oblast	10 January 2023	Sosnovaya Liniya timber mill	0	
Moscow	11 January 2023	Construction site	0	
Saint Petersburg	12 January 2023	Warehouse	0	
Manzherok, Altai Republic	17 January 2023	Hotel	0	
Angarsk	21 January 2023	Oil depot		
Kirov	25 January 2023	Church	0	
Moscow	28 January 2023	Warehouse		
Kstovo	7 February 2023	Oil refinery	0	
Novoshakhtinsk	8 February 2023	Oil refinery	0	
Yeremeytsevo, Yaroslavl Oblast	13 February 2023	Pipeline	0	
Krasnoyarsk	13 February 2023	Warehouse	0	
Yangiskain, Bashkortostan	13 February 2023	Livestock complex	0	
Moscow	14 February 2023	Car service station	0	
Kazan	14 February 2023	Rubber warehouse		
Kolomna	14 February 2023	Warehouse		
Magadan	17 February 2023	Truck warehouse		
Ufa	17 February 2023	Chemical plant	0	
Krasnoyarsk	22 February 2023	Warehouse	0	
Moscow	26 February 2023	Textile plant	0	
Tuapse	28 February 2023	Oil terminal	0	
Saint Petersburg	1 March 2023	Warehouse	0	
Saint Petersburg	2 March 2023	Textile warehouse and office complex	1	
Vidnoye, Moscow Oblast	5 March 2023	Coke and gas works		
Moscow	7 March 2023	Interior Ministry building		
Kolyubakino, Moscow Oblast	11 March 2023	Plastic production facility	0	
Moscow	11 March 2023	Spas TV office building	0	
Odintsovo	13 March 2023	Warehouse	0	
Rostov-on-Don	16 March 2023	FSB building	1	
Dolgoprudny	18 March 2023	Chemical plant	0	
Yaroslavl	23 March 2023	Yaroslavl Motor Plant	0	
Aramil, Sverdlovsk Oblast	24 March 2023	Research-and-production enterprise	0	
Aksay, Rostov Oblast	25 March 2023	Warehouse	0	
Pelym, Sverdlovsk Oblast	30 March 2023	Gas pipeline	0	
Moscow	5 April 2023	Defense ministry	0	
Voronezh	7 April 2023	Aircraft plant	0	
Nakhabino, Moscow Oblast	10 April 2023	Auto parts warehouse	0	
Kazan	16 April 2023	Tank training ground	0	
Stavropol	4 May 2023	Concrete production plant	0	
Moscow	4 May 2023	Administrative building	0	
Odintsovo	30 May 2023	Paper warehouse	3	
Novocherkasskaya, Rostov Oblast	14 June 2023	Power station	0	
Voronezh	24 June 2023	Fuel depot	0	
Sergiyev Posad	9 August 2023	Optics plant (Note: Initially reported as an optics plant, though the Governor of Moscow, Andrey Vorobyov, later claimed it was a pyrotechnics plant.)	2	
Makhachkala, Dagestan	14 August 2023	Fuel station	35	
St. Petersburg	3 September 2023	Ruchi oil depot		
Krasnoyarsk	4 October	Krasnoyarsk Aluminium Smelter		
Moscow	26 October 2023	Thermoelectric Power Plant		
Chelyabinsk	26 November 2023	Chelyabinsk Tractor Plant		

=== 2024 ===
NASA's FIRMS detected the fire at the Vysotsk LNG terminal from 2024-05-17 23:16:00 (UTC) to 2024-05-20 00:20:00 (UTC)

Location	Date	Facility	Deaths	Coordinates
near St Petersburg	21 January 2024	Gas terminal		
Belgorod	15 February 2024	Shopping center	4-6	
Vysotsk	18 May 2024	LNG terminal		60.61°N 28.56°E
Vyborg	19 May 2024	Oil depot		60.71°N 28.74°E
Moscow	14 June 2024	Sukhoi Design Bureau		
Fryazino, Moscow Oblast	24 June 2024	Platan Research Institute	8	
Makhachkala, Dagestan	27 September 2024	Gas station	13	

=== 2025 ===
Location	Date	Facility	Deaths	Coordinates
Kopeysk, Chelyabinsk Oblast	22 October 2025	2025 Plastmass Factory explosion	23	55.124765°N 61.5675°E

== See also ==
- 2024 Russian wildfires
- 2023 Kremlin drone explosion
- 2022 Siberian wildfires
- Attacks in Russia during the Russian invasion of Ukraine
- Crimean Bridge explosion
- Freedom of Russia Legion
- Rail war in Russia (2022–present)
- Russian military commissariats attacks
- Suspicious Russia-related deaths since 2022

== Notes ==
Original Russian terms
