= Kalinino =

Kalinino may refer to:

- Tashir, Armenia
- Kalinino, Azerbaijan
- Kalinino, Kazakhstan
- Kalininsk, Kyrgyzstan
- Kalinino, Astrakhan Oblast, Russia
- Kalinino, Chuvashia, Russia
- Kalinino, Kaliningrad Oblast, Russia
