= Noginsky (rural locality) =

Noginsky (Russian: Ногинский; masculine), Noginskaya (Ногинская; feminine), or Noginskoye (Ногинское; neuter) is the name of several rural localities in Russia:

- Noginskaya, Arkhangelsk Oblast, a village in Udimsky Selsoviet of Kotlassky District of Arkhangelsk Oblast
- Noginskaya, Ivanovo Oblast, a village in Kineshemsky District of Ivanovo Oblast
- Noginskaya, Syamzhensky District, Vologda Oblast, a village in Noginsky Selsoviet of Syamzhensky District of Vologda Oblast
- Noginskaya, Verkhovazhsky District, Vologda Oblast, a village in Kolengsky Selsoviet of Verkhovazhsky District of Vologda Oblast
