= Bykovka, Kineshemsky District, Ivanovo Oblast =

Bykovka Быковка
- Village
- Location within Ivanovo Oblast Location within Russia
- Coordinates: 57°26′N 41°55′E
- Country: Russia
- Region: Ivanovo Oblast
- District: Kineshemsky District
- Time zone: UTC+3:00

Bykovka (Russian: Быковка) is a rural locality (a village) in Kineshemsky District, Ivanovo Oblast, Russia. Population: 16 (2010 census);

== Geography ==
This rural locality is located 13 kilometres (8.1 mi) from Kineshma (the district's administrative centre), 76 kilometres (47 mi) from Ivanovo (capital of Ivanovo Oblast) and 319 kilometres (198 mi) from Moscow. Stanko is the nearest rural locality.
