= Shirshovka =

Shirshovka Ширшовка
- Village
- Location within Ivanovo Oblast Location within Russia
- Coordinates: 57°24′N 42°30′E
- Country: Russia
- Region: Ivanovo Oblast
- District: Kineshemsky District
- Time zone: UTC+3:00

Shirshovka (Russian: Ширшовка) is a rural locality (a village) in Kineshemsky District, Ivanovo Oblast, Russia. Population: 11 (2010 census);

== Geography ==
This rural locality is located 23 kilometres (14 mi) from Kineshma (the district's administrative centre), 103 kilometres (64 mi) from Ivanovo (capital of Ivanovo Oblast) and 345 kilometres (214 mi) from Moscow. Mukhortovo is the nearest rural locality.
