= Matveyevo, Ivanovo Oblast =

Matveyevo Матвеево
- Village
- Location within Ivanovo Oblast Location within Russia
- Coordinates: 57°17′N 42°33′E
- Country: Russia
- Region: Ivanovo Oblast
- District: Kineshemsky District
- Time zone: UTC+3:00

Matveyevo (Russian: Матвеево) is a rural locality (a village) in Kineshemsky District, Ivanovo Oblast, Russia. Population: 6 (2010 census);

== Geography ==
This rural locality is located 31 kilometres (19 mi) from Kineshma (the district's administrative centre), 102 kilometres (63 mi) from Ivanovo (capital of Ivanovo Oblast) and 343 kilometres (213 mi) from Moscow. Penki is the nearest rural locality.
