= Shileksha =

Shileksha Шилекша
- Village
- Location within Ivanovo Oblast Location within Russia
- Coordinates: 57°10′N 42°31′E
- Country: Russia
- Region: Ivanovo Oblast
- District: Kineshemsky District
- Time zone: UTC+3:00

Shileksha (Russian: Шилекша) is a rural locality (a selo) in Kineshemsky District, Ivanovo Oblast, Russia. Population: 441 (2010 census);

== Geography ==
This rural locality is located 39 kilometres (24 mi) from Kineshma (the district's administrative centre), 96 kilometres (60 mi) from Ivanovo (the capital of Ivanovo Oblast) and 336 kilometres (209 mi) from Moscow. Oleshevo is the nearest rural locality.
