= Petrishchevo, Ivanovo Oblast =

Petrishchevo Петрищево
- Village
- Location within Ivanovo Oblast Location within Russia
- Coordinates: 57°20′N 42°05′E
- Country: Russia
- Region: Ivanovo Oblast
- District: Kineshemsky District
- Time zone: UTC+3:00

Petrishchevo (Russian: Петрищево) is a rural locality (a village) in Kineshemsky District, Ivanovo Oblast, Russia. Population: 8 (2010 census);

== Geography ==
This rural locality is located 12 kilometres (7.5 mi) from Kineshma (the district's administrative centre), 79 kilometres (49 mi) from Ivanovo (capital of Ivanovo Oblast) and 322 kilometres (200 mi) from Moscow. Bogot is the nearest rural locality.
