= Stiberskoye =

Stiberskoye Стиберское
- Village
- Location within Ivanovo Oblast Location within Russia
- Coordinates: 57°26′N 42°45′E
- Country: Russia
- Region: Ivanovo Oblast
- District: Kineshemsky District
- Time zone: UTC+3:00

Stiberskoye (Russian: Стиберское) is a rural locality (a village) in Kineshemsky District, Ivanovo Oblast, Russia. Population: 69 (2010 census);

== Geography ==
This rural locality is located 37 kilometres (23 mi) from Kineshma (the district's administrative centre), 118 kilometres (73 mi) from Ivanovo (capital of Ivanovo Oblast) and 360 kilometres (220 mi) from Moscow. Sidorovka is the nearest rural locality.
