= Gavrilovo, Kineshemsky District, Ivanovo Oblast =

Gavrilovo Гаврилово
- Village
- Location within Ivanovo Oblast Location within Russia
- Coordinates: 57°20′N 42°27′E
- Country: Russia
- Region: Ivanovo Oblast
- District: Kineshemsky District
- Time zone: UTC+3:00

Gavrilovo (Russian: Гаврилово) is a rural locality (a village) in Kineshemsky District, Ivanovo Oblast, Russia. Population: 7 (2010 census);

== Geography ==
This rural locality is located 23 kilometres (14 mi) from Kineshma (the district's administrative centre), 97 kilometres (60 mi) from Ivanovo (capital of Ivanovo Oblast) and 339 kilometres (211 mi) from Moscow. Malanyino is the nearest rural locality.
