= Staroye Selo, Kineshemsky District, Ivanovo Oblast =

Staroye Selo Старое Село
- Village
- Location within Ivanovo Oblast Location within Russia
- Coordinates: 57°26′N 42°20′E
- Country: Russia
- Region: Ivanovo Oblast
- District: Kineshemsky District
- Time zone: UTC+3:00

Staroye Selo (Russian: Старое Село) is a rural locality (a village) in Kineshemsky District, Ivanovo Oblast, Russia. Population: 24 (2010 census);

== Geography ==
This rural locality is located 13 kilometres (8.1 mi) from Kineshma (the district's administrative centre), 96 kilometres (60 mi) from Ivanovo (capital of Ivanovo Oblast) and 339 kilometres (211 mi) from Moscow. Perfilyevo is the nearest rural locality.
