= Zimenki =

Zimenki Зименки
- Village
- Location within Ivanovo Oblast Location within Russia
- Coordinates: 57°25′N 42°20′E
- Country: Russia
- Region: Ivanovo Oblast
- District: Kineshemsky District
- Time zone: UTC+3:00

Zimenki (Russian: Зименки) is a rural locality (a village) in Kineshemsky District, Ivanovo Oblast, Russia. Population: 25 (2010 census);

== Geography ==
This rural locality is located 13 kilometres (8.1 mi) from Kineshma (the district's administrative centre), 95 kilometres (59 mi) from Ivanovo (capital of Ivanovo Oblast) and 338 kilometres (210 mi) from Moscow. Meshino is the nearest rural locality.
