= Stoyanikha =

Stoyanikha Стояниха
- Village
- Location within Ivanovo Oblast Location within Russia
- Coordinates: 57°09′N 42°32′E
- Country: Russia
- Region: Ivanovo Oblast
- District: Kineshemsky District
- Time zone: UTC+3:00

Stoyanikha (Russian: Стояниха) is a rural locality (a village) in Kineshemsky District, Ivanovo Oblast, Russia. Population: 7 (2010 census);

== Geography ==
This rural locality is located 40 kilometres (25 mi) from Kineshma (the district's administrative centre), 97 kilometres (60 mi) from Ivanovo (capital of Ivanovo Oblast) and 335 kilometres (208 mi) from Moscow. Barsuki is the nearest rural locality.
