= Lugovoye, Kineshemsky District, Ivanovo Oblast =

Lugovoye Луговое
- Village
- Location within Ivanovo Oblast Location within Russia
- Coordinates: 57°25′N 42°13′E
- Country: Russia
- Region: Ivanovo Oblast
- District: Kineshemsky District
- Time zone: UTC+3:00

Lugovoye (Russian: Луговое) is a rural locality (a village) in Kineshemsky District, Ivanovo Oblast, Russia. Population: 1,199 (2010 census);

== Geography ==
This rural locality is located 7 kilometres (4.3 mi) from Kineshma (the district's administrative centre), 89 kilometres (55 mi) from Ivanovo (capital of Ivanovo Oblast) and 332 kilometres (206 mi) from Moscow. Korikha is the nearest rural locality.
