= Dementyevo, Ivanovo Oblast =

Dementyevo Дементьево
- Village
- Location within Ivanovo Oblast Location within Russia
- Coordinates: 57°24′N 42°17′E
- Country: Russia
- Region: Ivanovo Oblast
- District: Kineshemsky District
- Time zone: UTC+3:00

Dementyevo (Russian: Дементьево) is a rural locality (a village) in Kineshemsky District, Ivanovo Oblast, Russia. Population: 6 (2010 census);

== Geography ==
This rural locality is located 10 kilometres (6.2 mi) from Kineshma (the district's administrative centre), 92 kilometres (57 mi) from Ivanovo (capital of Ivanovo Oblast) and 335 kilometres (208 mi) from Moscow. Romanovo is the nearest rural locality.
