= Zuikha, Ivanovo Oblast =

Zuikha Зуиха
- Village
- Location within Ivanovo Oblast Location within Russia
- Coordinates: 57°15′N 42°23′E
- Country: Russia
- Region: Ivanovo Oblast
- District: Kineshemsky District
- Time zone: UTC+3:00

Zuikha (Russian: Зуиха) is a rural locality (a village) in Kineshemsky District, Ivanovo Oblast, Russia. Population: 13 (2010 census);

== Geography ==
This rural locality is located 27 kilometres (17 mi) from Kineshma (the district's administrative centre), 91 kilometres (57 mi) from Ivanovo (capital of Ivanovo Oblast) and 332 kilometres (206 mi) from Moscow. Filinskaya is the nearest rural locality.
