= Batmany =

Batmany Батманы
- Village
- Location within Ivanovo Oblast Location within Russia
- Coordinates: 57°15′N 42°18′E
- Country: Russia
- Region: Ivanovo Oblast
- District: Kineshemsky District
- Time zone: UTC+3:00

Batmany (Russian: Батманы) is a rural locality (a selo) in Kineshemsky District, Ivanovo Oblast, Russia. Population: 307 (2010 census);

== Geography ==
This rural locality is located 23 kilometres (14 mi) from Kineshma (the district's administrative centre), 86 kilometres (53 mi) from Ivanovo (capital of Ivanovo Oblast) and 328 kilometres (204 mi) from Moscow. Golovinskaya is the nearest rural locality.
