= Ostashevo, Ivanovo Oblast =

Ostashevo Осташево
- Village
- Location within Ivanovo Oblast Location within Russia
- Coordinates: 57°22′N 42°06′E
- Country: Russia
- Region: Ivanovo Oblast
- District: Kineshemsky District
- Time zone: UTC+3:00

Ostashevo (Russian: Осташево) is a rural locality (a village) in Kineshemsky District, Ivanovo Oblast, Russia. Population: 270 (2010 census);

== Geography ==
This rural locality is located 8 kilometres (5.0 mi) from Kineshma (the district's administrative centre), 81 kilometres (50 mi) from Ivanovo (capital of Ivanovo Oblast) and 324 kilometres (201 mi) from Moscow. Vysokovo is the nearest rural locality.
