= Yakimovo, Kineshemsky District, Ivanovo Oblast =

Yakimovo Якимово
- Village
- Location within Ivanovo Oblast Location within Russia
- Coordinates: 57°26′N 42°36′E
- Country: Russia
- Region: Ivanovo Oblast
- District: Kineshemsky District
- Time zone: UTC+3:00

Yakimovo (Russian: Якимово) is a rural locality (a village) in Kineshemsky District, Ivanovo Oblast, Russia. Population: 24 (2010 census);

== Geography ==
This rural locality is located 29 kilometres (18 mi) from Kineshma (the district's administrative centre), 110 kilometres (68 mi) from Ivanovo (capital of Ivanovo Oblast) and 353 kilometres (219 mi) from Moscow. Ilyinskoye is the nearest rural locality.
