= Reshma, Ivanovo Oblast =

Reshma Решма
- Village
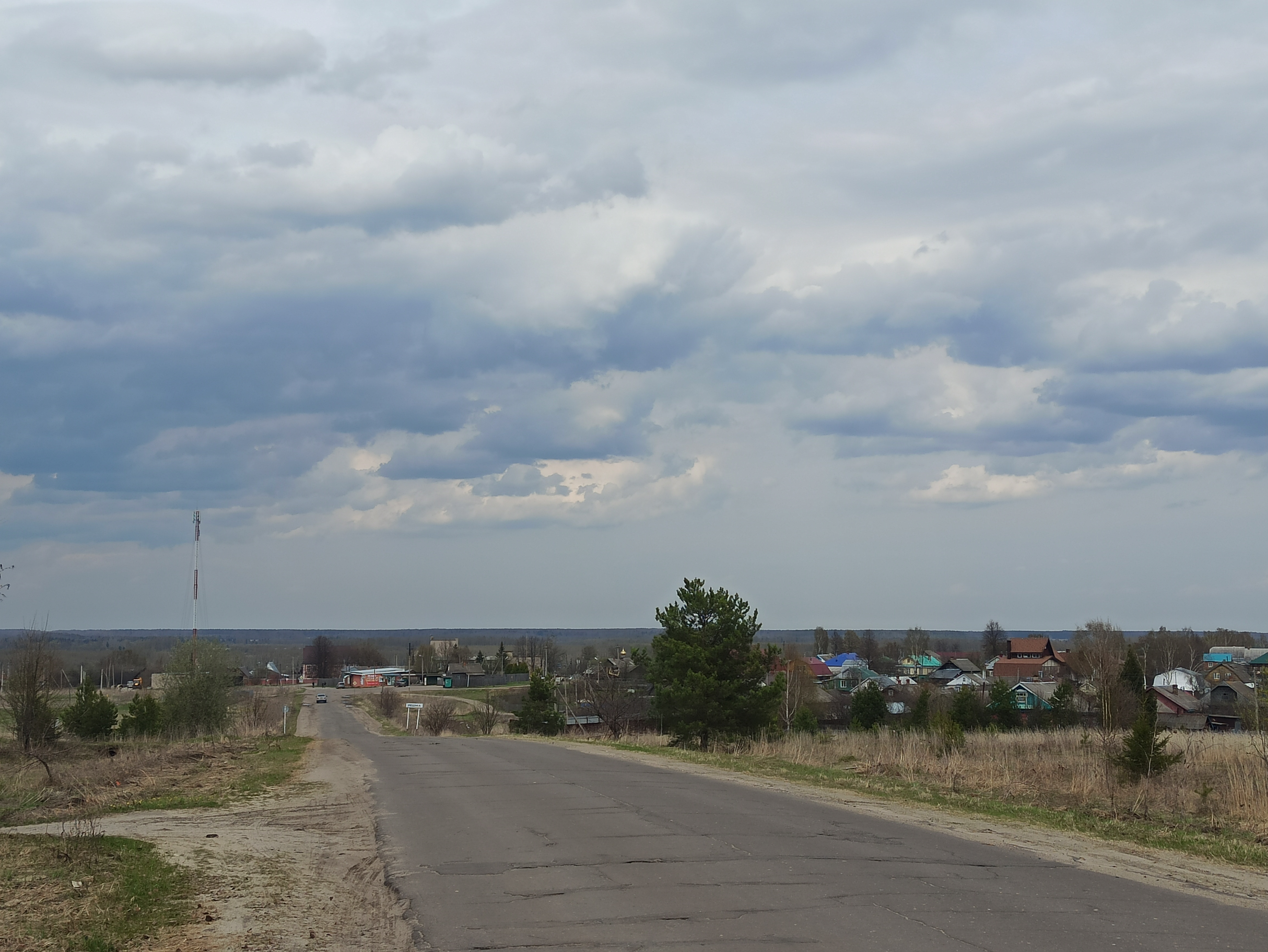

- Location within Ivanovo Oblast Location within Russia
- Coordinates: 57°24′N 42°33′E
- Country: Russia
- Region: Ivanovo Oblast
- District: Kineshemsky District
- Time zone: UTC+3:00

Reshma (Russian: Решма) is a rural locality (a selo) in Kineshemsky District, Ivanovo Oblast, Russia. Population: 911 (2010 census);

== Geography ==
This rural locality is located 26 kilometres (16 mi) from Kineshma (the district's administrative centre), 106 kilometres (66 mi) from Ivanovo (capital of Ivanovo Oblast) and 348 kilometres (216 mi) from Moscow. Kondrakovo is the nearest rural locality.
