= Belousikha =

Belousikha Белоусиха
- Village
- Location within Ivanovo Oblast Location within Russia
- Coordinates: 57°12′N 42°39′E
- Country: Russia
- Region: Ivanovo Oblast
- District: Kineshemsky District
- Time zone: UTC+3:00

Belousikha (Russian: Белоусиха) is a rural locality (a village) in Kineshemsky District, Ivanovo Oblast, Russia. Population: 17 (2010 census);

== Geography ==
This rural locality is located 41 kilometres (25 mi) from Kineshma (the district's administrative centre), 105 kilometres (65 mi) from Ivanovo (capital of Ivanovo Oblast) and 344 kilometres (214 mi) from Moscow. Reshetikha is the nearest rural locality.
