= Pospelikha Novaya =

Pospelikha Novaya Поспелиха Новая
- Village
- Location within Ivanovo Oblast Location within Russia
- Coordinates: 57°26′N 42°18′E
- Country: Russia
- Region: Ivanovo Oblast
- District: Kineshemsky District
- Time zone: UTC+3:00

Pospelikha Novaya (Russian: Поспелиха Новая) is a rural locality (a village) in Kineshemsky District, Ivanovo Oblast, Russia. Population: 16 (2010 census);

== Geography ==
This rural locality is located 11 kilometres (6.8 mi) from Kineshma (the district's administrative centre), 95 kilometres (59 mi) from Ivanovo (capital of Ivanovo Oblast) and 338 kilometres (210 mi) from Moscow. Pospelikha Staraya is the nearest rural locality.
