= 4th Central Scientific Research Institute (Russia) =

- 4-й центральный научно-исследовательский институт
- Active: 1946–present
- Country: Soviet Union (1961–1991); Russia (1992–2011)
- Type: Scientific Research
- Part of: Ministry of Defense
- Garrison/HQ: Yubileyny, Moscow Oblast

Commanders
- Current commander: Sergei Tarazevich

4th Central Scientific Research Institute of the Ministry of Defense of Russia (Russian: 4-й центральный научно-исследовательский институт Министерства обороны Российской Федерации), known in its Russian acronym 4 TSNII (Russian: 4 ЦНИИ Минобороны России) is the largest scientific organization of the Ministry of Defence of Russia, solving a wide range of problems related to scientific support for the development of the Strategic Rocket Forces and the development of strategic missile weapons. It is located in the Yubileyny district of Korolyov, Moscow Oblast. The traditional focus of the 4th Central Research Institute is the substantiation of tactical and technical requirements for new and modernized weapons systems and the military-scientific support of key R&D projects. A significant component of the institute's overall research is work in the fields of automated troop and weapon control, the implementation of modern telecommunications technologies in military practice, and information security. The 4th Central Research Institute also monitors the technical condition of weapons and military equipment and provides the Strategic Missile Forces command with objective information on the technical condition and reliability of their weapons.

== History ==
In the 1980s, the Institute's activities were aimed at ensuring the qualitative development of the Strategic Rocket Forces grouping based on new-generation mobile and stationary systems.

In the 1990s, the Institute's primary objectives were to maintain the combat potential of the Strategic Rocket Forces at the required level in the face of the military-political situation, the reduction of offensive weapons, and the declining funding of the Russian Ministry of Defense and defense industries.

At the end of 1997, units of the 50th Central Research Institute of the Aerospace Forces of the Russian Ministry of Defense and the 45th Central Research Institute of the Russian Ministry of Defense were integrated into the Institute.

In accordance with the order of the Minister of Defense of the Russian Federation dated May 24, 2010 No. 551 "On the reorganization of federal government agencies subordinate to the Ministry of Defense of the Russian Federation" and in order to improve the structure of the military-scientific complex of the Russian Armed Forces, from December 1, 2010, the 4th Central Research Institute of the Ministry of Defense of Russia was reorganized: three research institutes were merged with it as structural divisions: the 2nd Central Research Institute, the 30th Central Scientific Research Institute and the 13th State Research Institute of the Ministry of Defense of Russia. The Institute was renamed the 4th Central Research Institute of Missile, Space, and Aviation Systems of the Ministry of Defense of the Russian Federation.

In October 2013, the 4th Central Research Institute of the Ministry of Defense of Russia was reorganized by spinning off the FSBI Central Research Institute of the Air Force (Shchyolkovo, Moscow Oblast) and the FSBI Central Research Institute of the Aerospace Defense Forces (Yubileyny, Moscow Oblast).

In 2016, the 4th Central Research Institute of the Ministry of Defense of Russia celebrated its 70th anniversary.
