= Ustnovo =

Ustnovo Устново
- Village
- Location within Ivanovo Oblast Location within Russia
- Coordinates: 57°19′N 42°03′E
- Country: Russia
- Region: Ivanovo Oblast
- District: Kineshemsky District
- Time zone: UTC+3:00

Ustnovo (Russian: Устново) is a rural locality (a village) in Kineshemsky District, Ivanovo Oblast, Russia. Population: 11 (2010 census);

== Geography ==
This rural locality is located 14 kilometres (8.7 mi) from Kineshma (the district's administrative centre), 76 kilometres (47 mi) from Ivanovo (capital of Ivanovo Oblast) and 319 kilometres (198 mi) from Moscow. Peshkovo is the nearest rural locality.
