= Penki, Kineshemsky District, Ivanovo Oblast =

Penki Пеньки
- Village
- Location within Ivanovo Oblast Location within Russia
- Coordinates: 57°17′N 42°33′E
- Country: Russia
- Region: Ivanovo Oblast
- District: Kineshemsky District
- Time zone: UTC+3:00

Penki (Russian: Пеньки) is a rural locality (a village) in Kineshemsky District, Ivanovo Oblast, Russia. Population: 58 (2010 census);

== Geography ==
This rural locality is located 31 kilometres (19 mi) from Kineshma (the district's administrative centre), 101 kilometres (63 mi) from Ivanovo (capital of Ivanovo Oblast) and 343 kilometres (213 mi) from Moscow. Matveyevo is the nearest rural locality.
