= Shanino =

Shanino Шанино
- Village
- Location within Ivanovo Oblast Location within Russia
- Coordinates: 57°11′N 42°23′E
- Country: Russia
- Region: Ivanovo Oblast
- District: Kineshemsky District
- Time zone: UTC+3:00

Shanino (Russian: Шанино) is a rural locality (a village) in Kineshemsky District, Ivanovo Oblast, Russia. Population: 14 (2010 census);

== Geography ==
This rural locality is located 33 kilometres (21 mi) from Kineshma (the district's administrative centre), 89 kilometres (55 mi) from Ivanovo (capital of Ivanovo Oblast) and 329 kilometres (204 mi) from Moscow. Kraychikovo is the nearest rural locality.
