= Sidorovskaya, Ivanovo Oblast =

Sidorovskaya Сидоровская
- Village
- Location within Ivanovo Oblast Location within Russia
- Coordinates: 57°15′N 42°20′E
- Country: Russia
- Region: Ivanovo Oblast
- District: Kineshemsky District
- Time zone: UTC+3:00

Sidorovskaya (Russian: Сидоровская) is a rural locality (a village) in Kineshemsky District, Ivanovo Oblast, Russia. Population: 13 (2010 census);

== Geography ==
This rural locality is located 25 kilometres (16 mi) from Kineshma (the district's administrative centre), 88 kilometres (55 mi) from Ivanovo (capital of Ivanovo Oblast) and 330 kilometres (210 mi) from Moscow. Podkurnovo is the nearest rural locality.
