= Galitskaya, Ivanovo Oblast =

Galitskaya Галицкая
- Village
- Location within Ivanovo Oblast Location within Russia
- Coordinates: 57°12′N 42°27′E
- Country: Russia
- Region: Ivanovo Oblast
- District: Kineshemsky District
- Time zone: UTC+3:00

Galitskaya (Russian: Галицкая) is a rural locality (a village) in Kineshemsky District, Ivanovo Oblast, Russia. Population: 18 (2010 census);

== Geography ==
This rural locality is located 33 kilometres (21 mi) from Kineshma (the district's administrative centre), 93 kilometres (58 mi) from Ivanovo (capital of Ivanovo Oblast) and 334 kilometres (208 mi) from Moscow. Dmitrikovo is the nearest rural locality.
