= Kondrakovo, Kineshemsky District, Ivanovo Oblast =

Kondrakovo Кондраково
- Village
- Location within Ivanovo Oblast Location within Russia
- Coordinates: 57°23′N 42°31′E
- Country: Russia
- Region: Ivanovo Oblast
- District: Kineshemsky District
- Time zone: UTC+3:00

Kondrakovo (Russian: Кондраково) is a rural locality (a village) in Kineshemsky District, Ivanovo Oblast, Russia. Population: 17 (2010 census);

== Geography ==
This rural locality is located 25 kilometres (16 mi) from Kineshma (the district's administrative centre), 104 kilometres (65 mi) from Ivanovo (capital of Ivanovo Oblast) and 346 kilometres (215 mi) from Moscow. Vakhnevo is the nearest rural locality.
