= Laskarikha =

Laskarikha Ласкариха
- Village
- Flag

- Location within Russia Location within Ivanovo Oblast
- Coordinates: 57°26′N 42°41′E
- Country: Russia
- Region: Ivanovo Oblast
- District: Kineshemsky District
- Time zone: UTC+3:00

Laskarikha (Russian: Ласкариха) is a rural locality (a village) in Kineshemsky District, Ivanovo Oblast, Russia. Population: 146 (2010 census);

== Geography ==
This rural locality is located 34 kilometres (21 mi) from Kineshma (the district's administrative centre), 115 kilometres (71 mi) from Ivanovo (capital of Ivanovo Oblast) and 357 kilometres (222 mi) from Moscow. Yefremovka is the nearest rural locality.
