= Stanko, Ivanovo Oblast =

Stanko Станко
- Village
- Location within Ivanovo Oblast Location within Russia
- Coordinates: 57°27′N 41°55′E
- Country: Russia
- Region: Ivanovo Oblast
- District: Kineshemsky District
- Time zone: UTC+3:00

Stanko (Russian: Станко) is a rural locality (a village) in Kineshemsky District, Ivanovo Oblast, Russia. Population: 319 (2010 census);

== Geography ==
This rural locality is located 13 kilometres (8.1 mi) from Kineshma (the district's administrative centre), 77 kilometres (48 mi) from Ivanovo (capital of Ivanovo Oblast) and 319 kilometres (198 mi) from Moscow. Bykovka is the nearest rural locality.
