= Bulavino =

Bulavino Булавино
- Village
- Location within Ivanovo Oblast Location within Russia
- Coordinates: 57°22′N 42°09′E
- Country: Russia
- Region: Ivanovo Oblast
- District: Kineshemsky District
- Time zone: UTC+3:00

Bulavino (Russian: Булавино) is a rural locality (a village) in Kineshemsky District, Ivanovo Oblast, Russia. Population: 35 (2010 census);

== Geography ==
This rural locality is located 8 kilometres (5.0 mi) from Kineshma (the district's administrative centre), 83 kilometres (52 mi) from Ivanovo (capital of Ivanovo Oblast) and 326 kilometres (203 mi) from Moscow. Plaksino is the nearest rural locality.
