= Vysokovo, Kineshemsky District, Ivanovo Oblast =

Vysokovo Высоково
- Village
- Location within Ivanovo Oblast Location within Russia
- Coordinates: 57°22′N 42°06′E
- Country: Russia
- Region: Ivanovo Oblast
- District: Kineshemsky District
- Time zone: UTC+3:00

Vysokovo (Russian: Высоково) is a rural locality (a village) in Kineshemsky District, Ivanovo Oblast, Russia. Population: 11 (2010 census);

== Geography ==
This rural locality is located 8 kilometres (5.0 mi) from Kineshma (the district's administrative centre), 81 kilometres (50 mi) from Ivanovo (capital of Ivanovo Oblast) and 325 kilometres (202 mi) from Moscow. Ostashevo is the nearest rural locality.
