= Oleshevo, Ivanovo Oblast =

Oleshevo Олешево
- Village
- Location within Ivanovo Oblast Location within Russia
- Coordinates: 57°10′N 42°32′E
- Country: Russia
- Region: Ivanovo Oblast
- District: Kineshemsky District
- Time zone: UTC+3:00

Oleshevo (Russian: Олешево) is a rural locality (a village) in Kineshemsky District, Ivanovo Oblast, Russia. Population: 12 (2010 census);

== Geography ==
This rural locality is located 39 kilometres (24 mi) from Kineshma (the district's administrative centre), 97 kilometres (60 mi) from Ivanovo (capital of Ivanovo Oblast) and 337 kilometres (209 mi) from Moscow. Lapshinovo is the nearest rural locality.
