= Kuznechikha, Kineshemsky District, Ivanovo Oblast =

Kuznechikha Кузнечиха
- Village
- Location within Ivanovo Oblast Location within Russia
- Coordinates: 57°12′N 42°20′E
- Country: Russia
- Region: Ivanovo Oblast
- District: Kineshemsky District
- Time zone: UTC+3:00

Kuznechikha (Russian: Кузнечиха) is a rural locality (a village) in Kineshemsky District, Ivanovo Oblast, Russia. Population: 17 (2010 census);

== Geography ==
This rural locality is located 29 kilometres (18 mi) from Kineshma (the district's administrative centre), 86 kilometres (53 mi) from Ivanovo (capital of Ivanovo Oblast) and 327 kilometres (203 mi) from Moscow. Semenovo is the nearest rural locality.
