= Zobnino =

Zobnino Зобнино
- Village
- Location within Ivanovo Oblast Location within Russia
- Coordinates: 57°12′N 42°36′E
- Country: Russia
- Region: Ivanovo Oblast
- District: Kineshemsky District
- Time zone: UTC+3:00

Zobnino (Russian: Зобнино) is a rural locality (a village) in Kineshemsky District, Ivanovo Oblast, Russia. Population: 289 (2010 census);

== Geography ==
This rural locality is located 40 kilometres (25 mi) from Kineshma (the district's administrative centre), 101 kilometres (63 mi) from Ivanovo (capital of Ivanovo Oblast) and 341 kilometres (212 mi) from Moscow. Nesterovo is the nearest rural locality.
