= Taratino, Ivanovo Oblast =

Taratino Таратино
- Village
- Location within Ivanovo Oblast Location within Russia
- Coordinates: 57°07′N 42°29′E
- Country: Russia
- Region: Ivanovo Oblast
- District: Kineshemsky District
- Time zone: UTC+3:00

Taratino (Russian: Таратино) is a rural locality (a village) in Kineshemsky District, Ivanovo Oblast, Russia. Population: 29 (2010 census);

== Geography ==
This rural locality is located 42 kilometres (26 mi) from Kineshma (the district's administrative centre), 93 kilometres (58 mi) from Ivanovo (capital of Ivanovo Oblast) and 331 kilometres (206 mi) from Moscow. Bakharevo is the nearest rural locality.
