= Ivanikha Bolshaya =

Ivanikha Bolshaya Иваниха Большая
- Village
- Location within Ivanovo Oblast Location within Russia
- Coordinates: 57°26′N 42°16′E
- Country: Russia
- Region: Ivanovo Oblast
- District: Kineshemsky District
- Time zone: UTC+3:00

Ivanikha Bolshaya (Russian: Иваниха Большая) is a rural locality (a village) in Kineshemsky District, Ivanovo Oblast, Russia. Population: 182 (2010 census);

== Geography ==
This rural locality is located 8 kilometres (5.0 mi) from Kineshma (the district's administrative centre), 93 kilometres (58 mi) from Ivanovo (capital of Ivanovo Oblast) and 336 kilometres (209 mi) from Moscow. Sheronikha is the nearest rural locality.
