= Tarasikha, Kineshemsky District, Ivanovo Oblast =

Tarasikha Тарасиха
- Village
- Location within Ivanovo Oblast Location within Russia
- Coordinates: 57°25′N 41°58′E
- Country: Russia
- Region: Ivanovo Oblast
- District: Kineshemsky District
- Time zone: UTC+3:00

Tarasikha (Russian: Тарасиха) is a rural locality (a village) in Kineshemsky District, Ivanovo Oblast, Russia. Population: 200 (2010 census);

== Geography ==
This rural locality is located 10 kilometres (6.2 mi) from Kineshma (the district's administrative centre), 77 kilometres (48 mi) from Ivanovo (capital of Ivanovo Oblast) and 320 kilometres (200 mi) from Moscow. Trevrazhnoye is the nearest rural locality.
