= Samsonikha, Ivanovo Oblast =

Samsonikha Самсониха
- Village
- Location within Ivanovo Oblast Location within Russia
- Coordinates: 57°11′N 42°33′E
- Country: Russia
- Region: Ivanovo Oblast
- District: Kineshemsky District
- Time zone: UTC+3:00

Samsonikha (Russian: Самсониха) is a rural locality (a village) in Kineshemsky District, Ivanovo Oblast, Russia. Population: 12 (2010 census);

== Geography ==
This rural locality is located 39 kilometres (24 mi) from Kineshma (the district's administrative centre), 98 kilometres (61 mi) from Ivanovo (capital of Ivanovo Oblast) and 338 kilometres (210 mi) from Moscow. Shiryaikha is the nearest rural locality.
