= Vashurovo =

Vashurovo Вашурово
- Village
- Location within Ivanovo Oblast Location within Russia
- Coordinates: 57°13′N 42°34′E
- Country: Russia
- Region: Ivanovo Oblast
- District: Kineshemsky District
- Time zone: UTC+3:00

Vashurovo (Russian: Вашурово) is a rural locality (a village) in Kineshemsky District, Ivanovo Oblast, Russia. Population: 7 (2010 census);

== Geography ==
This rural locality is located 38 kilometres (24 mi) from Kineshma (the district's administrative centre), 101 kilometres (63 mi) from Ivanovo (capital of Ivanovo Oblast) and 341 kilometres (212 mi) from Moscow. Lgotino is the nearest rural locality.
