= Votolino, Ivanovo Oblast =

Votolino Вотолино
- Village
- Location within Ivanovo Oblast Location within Russia
- Coordinates: 57°12′N 42°36′E
- Country: Russia
- Region: Ivanovo Oblast
- District: Kineshemsky District
- Time zone: UTC+3:00

Votolino (Russian: Вотолино) is a rural locality (a village) in Kineshemsky District, Ivanovo Oblast, Russia. Population: 19 (2010 census);

== Geography ==
This rural locality is located 39 kilometres (24 mi) from Kineshma (the district's administrative centre), 102 kilometres (63 mi) from Ivanovo (capital of Ivanovo Oblast) and 342 kilometres (213 mi) from Moscow. Vereshchagino is the nearest rural locality.
