= Lodygino, Kineshemsky District, Ivanovo Oblast =

Lodygino Лодыгино
- Village
- Location within Ivanovo Oblast Location within Russia
- Coordinates: 57°21′N 42°18′E
- Country: Russia
- Region: Ivanovo Oblast
- District: Kineshemsky District
- Time zone: UTC+3:00

Lodygino (Russian: Лодыгино) is a rural locality (a village) in Kineshemsky District, Ivanovo Oblast, Russia. Population: 9 (2010 census);

== Geography ==
This rural locality is located 15 kilometres (9.3 mi) from Kineshma (the district's administrative centre), 90 kilometres (56 mi) from Ivanovo (capital of Ivanovo Oblast) and 333 kilometres (207 mi) from Moscow. Yakunino is the nearest rural locality.
