= Akishevo, Ivanovo Oblast =

Akishevo Акишево
- Village
- Location within Ivanovo Oblast Location within Russia
- Coordinates: 57°25′N 42°14′E
- Country: Russia
- Region: Ivanovo Oblast
- District: Kineshemsky District
- Time zone: UTC+3:00

Akishevo (Russian: Акишево) is a rural locality (a village) in Kineshemsky District, Ivanovo Oblast, Russia. Population: 58 (2010 census);

== Geography ==
This rural locality is located 7 kilometres (4.3 mi) from Kineshma (the district's administrative centre), 90 kilometres (56 mi) from Ivanovo (capital of Ivanovo Oblast) and 333 kilometres (207 mi) from Moscow. Melino is the nearest rural locality.
