= Bakharevo, Ivanovo Oblast =

Bakharevo Бахарево
- Village
- Location within Ivanovo Oblast Location within Russia
- Coordinates: 57°07′N 42°29′E
- Country: Russia
- Region: Ivanovo Oblast
- District: Kineshemsky District
- Time zone: UTC+3:00

Bakharevo (Russian: Бахарево) is a rural locality (a selo) in Kineshemsky District, Ivanovo Oblast, Russia. Population: 169 (2010 census);

== Geography ==
This rural locality is located 43 kilometres (27 mi) from Kineshma (the district's administrative centre), 93 kilometres (58 mi) from Ivanovo (capital of Ivanovo Oblast) and 331 kilometres (206 mi) from Moscow. Taratino is the nearest rural locality.
