= Belukhino =

Belukhino Белухино
- Village
- Location within Ivanovo Oblast Location within Russia
- Coordinates: 57°21′N 42°06′E
- Country: Russia
- Region: Ivanovo Oblast
- District: Kineshemsky District
- Time zone: UTC+3:00

Belukhino (Russian: Белухино) is a rural locality (a village) in Kineshemsky District, Ivanovo Oblast, Russia. Population: 12 (2010 census);

== Geography ==
This rural locality is located 11 kilometres (6.8 mi) from Kineshma (the district's administrative centre), 79 kilometres (49 mi) from Ivanovo (capital of Ivanovo Oblast) and 322 kilometres (200 mi) from Moscow. Petrishchevo is the nearest rural locality.
