= Babenkovo =

Babenkovo Бабенково
- Village
- Location within Ivanovo Oblast Location within Russia
- Coordinates: 57°12′N 42°31′E
- Country: Russia
- Region: Ivanovo Oblast
- District: Kineshemsky District
- Time zone: UTC+3:00

Babenkovo (Russian: Бабенково) is a rural locality (a village) in Kineshemsky District, Ivanovo Oblast, Russia. Population: 10 (2010 census);

== Geography ==
This rural locality is located 36 kilometres (22 mi) from Kineshma (the district's administrative centre), 97 kilometres (60 mi) from Ivanovo (capital of Ivanovo Oblast) and 337 kilometres (209 mi) from Moscow. Lomki is the nearest rural locality.
