= Tregubikha =

Tregubikha Трегубиха
- Village
- Location within Ivanovo Oblast Location within Russia
- Coordinates: 57°12′N 42°35′E
- Country: Russia
- Region: Ivanovo Oblast
- District: Kineshemsky District
- Time zone: UTC+3:00

Tregubikha (Russian: Трегубиха) is a rural locality (a village) in Kineshemsky District, Ivanovo Oblast, Russia. Population: 7 (2010 census);

== Geography ==
This rural locality is located 38 kilometres (24 mi) from Kineshma (the district's administrative centre), 100 kilometres (62 mi) from Ivanovo (capital of Ivanovo Oblast) and 340 kilometres (210 mi) from Moscow. Vereshchagino is the nearest rural locality.
