= Gribtsovo, Ivanovo Oblast =

Gribtsovo Грибцово
- Village
- Location within Ivanovo Oblast Location within Russia
- Coordinates: 57°21′N 42°32′E
- Country: Russia
- Region: Ivanovo Oblast
- District: Kineshemsky District
- Time zone: UTC+3:00

Gribtsovo (Russian: Грибцово) is a rural locality (a village) in Kineshemsky District, Ivanovo Oblast, Russia. Population: 7 (2010 census);

== Geography ==
This rural locality is located 27 kilometres (17 mi) from Kineshma (the district's administrative centre), 103 kilometres (64 mi) from Ivanovo (capital of Ivanovo Oblast) and 345 kilometres (214 mi) from Moscow. Dyukolovo is the nearest rural locality.
