= Gorki Bolshiye =

Gorki Bolshiye Горки Большие
- Village
- Location within Ivanovo Oblast Location within Russia
- Coordinates: 57°15′N 42°14′E
- Country: Russia
- Region: Ivanovo Oblast
- District: Kineshemsky District
- Time zone: UTC+3:00

Gorki Bolshiye (Russian: Горки Большие) is a rural locality (a village) in Kineshemsky District, Ivanovo Oblast, Russia. Population: 28 (2010 census);

== Geography ==
This rural locality is located 22 kilometres (14 mi) from Kineshma (the district's administrative centre), 82 kilometres (51 mi) from Ivanovo (capital of Ivanovo Oblast) and 324 kilometres (201 mi) from Moscow. Vakhutki is the nearest rural locality.
