= Kislyachikha =

Kislyachikha Кислячиха
- Village
- Location within Ivanovo Oblast Location within Russia
- Coordinates: 57°12′N 42°15′E
- Country: Russia
- Region: Ivanovo Oblast
- District: Kineshemsky District
- Time zone: UTC+3:00

Kislyachikha (Russian: Кислячиха) is a rural locality (a village) in Kineshemsky District, Ivanovo Oblast, Russia. Population: 23 (2010 census);

== Geography ==
This rural locality is located 27 kilometres (17 mi) from Kineshma (the district's administrative centre), 82 kilometres (51 mi) from Ivanovo (capital of Ivanovo Oblast) and 323 kilometres (201 mi) from Moscow. Pyaterikovo is the nearest rural locality.
