= Mysy, Ivanovo Oblast =

Mysy Мысы
- Village
- Location within Ivanovo Oblast Location within Russia
- Coordinates: 57°26′N 42°26′E
- Country: Russia
- Region: Ivanovo Oblast
- District: Kineshemsky District
- Time zone: UTC+3:00

Mysy (Russian: Мысы) is a rural locality (a village) in Kineshemsky District, Ivanovo Oblast, Russia. Population: 9 (2010 census);

== Geography ==
This rural locality is located 19 kilometres (12 mi) from Kineshma (the district's administrative centre), 101 kilometres (63 mi) from Ivanovo (capital of Ivanovo Oblast) and 344 kilometres (214 mi) from Moscow. Ogarikha is the nearest rural locality.
