= Afachikha =

Afachikha Афачиха
- Village
- Location within Ivanovo Oblast Location within Russia
- Coordinates: 57°10′N 42°29′E
- Country: Russia
- Region: Ivanovo Oblast
- District: Kineshemsky District
- Time zone: UTC+3:00

Afachikha (Russian: Афачиха) is a rural locality (a village) in Kineshemsky District, Ivanovo Oblast, Russia. Population: 8 (2010 census);

== Geography ==
This rural locality is located 38 kilometres (24 mi) from Kineshma (the district's administrative centre), 94 kilometres (58 mi) from Ivanovo (capital of Ivanovo Oblast) and 334 kilometres (208 mi) from Moscow. Skokovo is the nearest rural locality.
