= Sheronikha =

Sheronikha Шерониха
- Village
- Location within Ivanovo Oblast Location within Russia
- Coordinates: 57°26′N 42°15′E
- Country: Russia
- Region: Ivanovo Oblast
- District: Kineshemsky District
- Time zone: UTC+3:00

Sheronikha (Russian: Шерониха) is a rural locality (a village) in Kineshemsky District, Ivanovo Oblast, Russia. Population: 26 (2010 census);

== Geography ==
This rural locality is located 7 kilometres (4.3 mi) from Kineshma (the district's administrative centre), 92 kilometres (57 mi) from Ivanovo (capital of Ivanovo Oblast) and 335 kilometres (208 mi) from Moscow. Kryuchikha is the nearest rural locality.
