= Yakushevo, Kineshemsky District, Ivanovo Oblast =

Yakushevo Якушево
- Village
- Location within Ivanovo Oblast Location within Russia
- Coordinates: 57°23′N 42°35′E
- Country: Russia
- Region: Ivanovo Oblast
- District: Kineshemsky District
- Time zone: UTC+3:00

Yakushevo (Russian: Якушево) is a rural locality (a village) in Kineshemsky District, Ivanovo Oblast, Russia. Population: 95 (2010 census);

== Geography ==
This rural locality is located 28 kilometres (17 mi) from Kineshma (the district's administrative centre), 107 kilometres (66 mi) from Ivanovo (capital of Ivanovo Oblast) and 349 kilometres (217 mi) from Moscow. Budilovo is the nearest rural locality.
