= Skokovo, Kineshemsky District, Ivanovo Oblast =

Skokovo Скоково
- Village
- Location within Ivanovo Oblast Location within Russia
- Coordinates: 57°10′N 42°28′E
- Country: Russia
- Region: Ivanovo Oblast
- District: Kineshemsky District
- Time zone: UTC+3:00

Skokovo (Russian: Скоково) is a rural locality (a village) in Kineshemsky District, Ivanovo Oblast, Russia. Population: 14 (2010 census);

== Geography ==
This rural locality is located 37 kilometres (23 mi) from Kineshma (the district's administrative centre), 93 kilometres (58 mi) from Ivanovo (capital of Ivanovo Oblast) and 332 kilometres (206 mi) from Moscow. Afachikha is the nearest rural locality.
