= Sidorovka, Ivanovo Oblast =

Sidorovka Сидоровка
- Village
- Location within Ivanovo Oblast Location within Russia
- Coordinates: 57°26′N 42°44′E
- Country: Russia
- Region: Ivanovo Oblast
- District: Kineshemsky District
- Time zone: UTC+3:00

Sidorovka (Russian: Сидоровка) is a rural locality (a village) in Kineshemsky District, Ivanovo Oblast, Russia. Population: 7 (2010 census);

== Geography ==
This rural locality is located 36 kilometres (22 mi) from Kineshma (the district's administrative centre), 117 kilometres (73 mi) from Ivanovo (capital of Ivanovo Oblast) and 359 kilometres (223 mi) from Moscow. Balakhonka is the nearest rural locality.
