= Yefremovka, Ivanovo Oblast =

Yefremovka Ефремовка
- Village
- Location within Ivanovo Oblast Location within Russia
- Coordinates: 57°27′N 42°41′E
- Country: Russia
- Region: Ivanovo Oblast
- District: Kineshemsky District
- Time zone: UTC+3:00

Yefremovka (Russian: Ефремовка) is a rural locality (a village) in Kineshemsky District, Ivanovo Oblast, Russia. Population: 10 (2010 census);

== Geography ==
This rural locality is located 34 kilometres (21 mi) from Kineshma (the district's administrative centre), 115 kilometres (71 mi) from Ivanovo (capital of Ivanovo Oblast) and 357 kilometres (222 mi) from Moscow. Laskarikha is the nearest rural locality.
