= Noginskaya, Ivanovo Oblast =

Noginskaya Ногинская
- Village
- Location within Ivanovo Oblast Location within Russia
- Coordinates: 57°15′N 42°24′E
- Country: Russia
- Region: Ivanovo Oblast
- District: Kineshemsky District
- Time zone: UTC+3:00

Noginskaya (Russian: Ногинская) is a rural locality (a village) in Kineshemsky District, Ivanovo Oblast, Russia. Population: 12 (2010 census);

== Geography ==
This rural locality is located 27 kilometres (17 mi) from Kineshma (the district's administrative centre), 92 kilometres (57 mi) from Ivanovo (capital of Ivanovo Oblast) and 334 kilometres (208 mi) from Moscow. Zamostnaya is the nearest rural locality.
