= Noginsky =

Noginsky (masculine), Noginskaya (feminine), or Noginskoye (neuter) may refer to:

- Noginsky District, a district of Moscow Oblast, Russia
- Noginsky (rural locality) (Noginskaya, Noginskoye), name of several rural localities in Russia
