= Navoloki =

Navoloki (Russian: Наволоки) is the name of several inhabited localities in Russia.

Urban localities

- Navoloki, Ivanovo Oblast, a town in Kineshemsky District of Ivanovo Oblast

Rural localities

- Navoloki, Vologda Oblast, a village in Berezovsky Selsoviet of Nyuksensky District in Vologda Oblast
- Navoloki, Yaroslavl Oblast, a village in Arefinsky Rural Okrug of Rybinsky District in Yaroslavl Oblast
