= Navoloki, Ivanovo Oblast =

Town in Ivanovo Oblast, Russia

Navoloki Наволоки
- Town
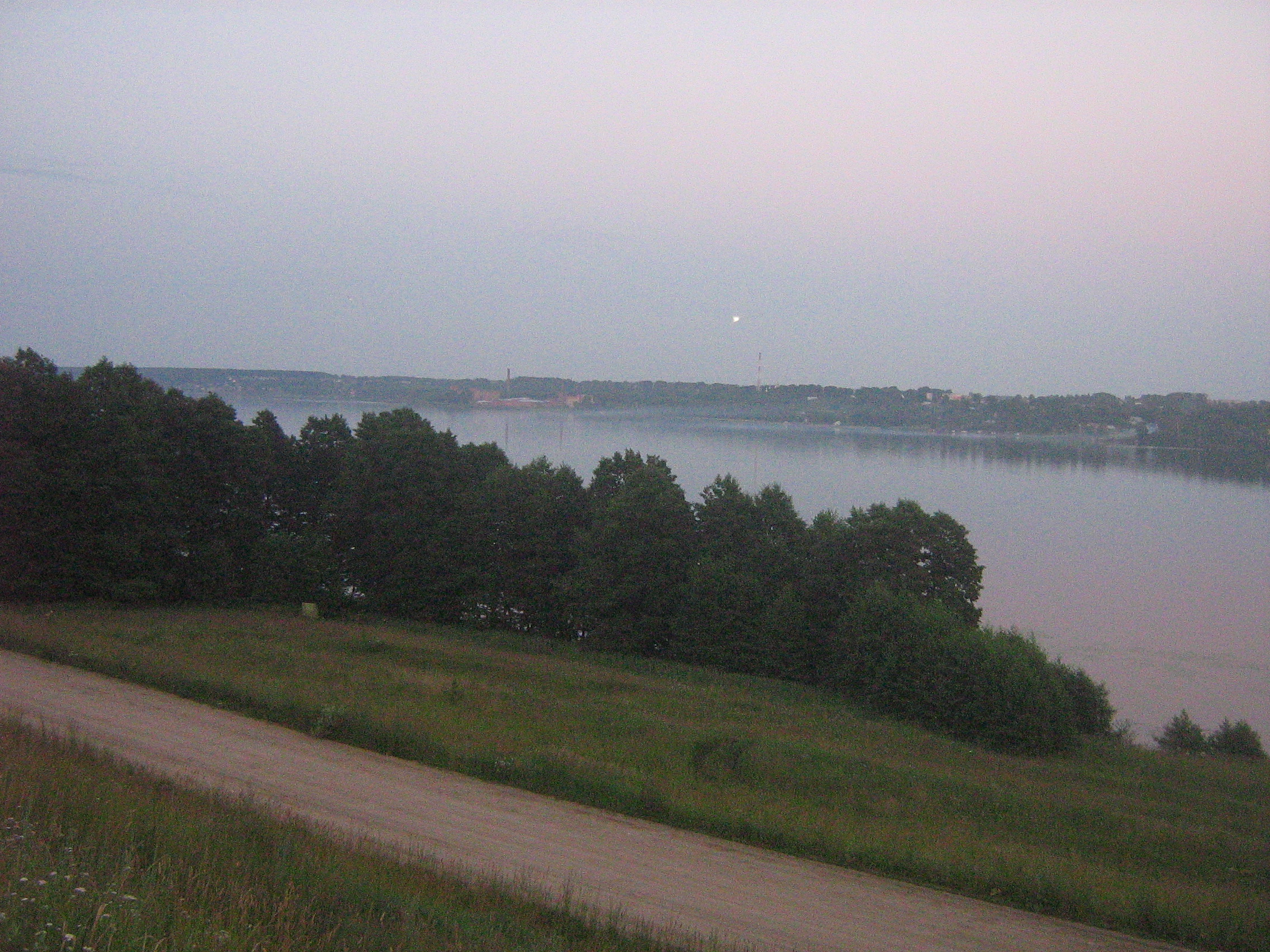
- View of Navoloki

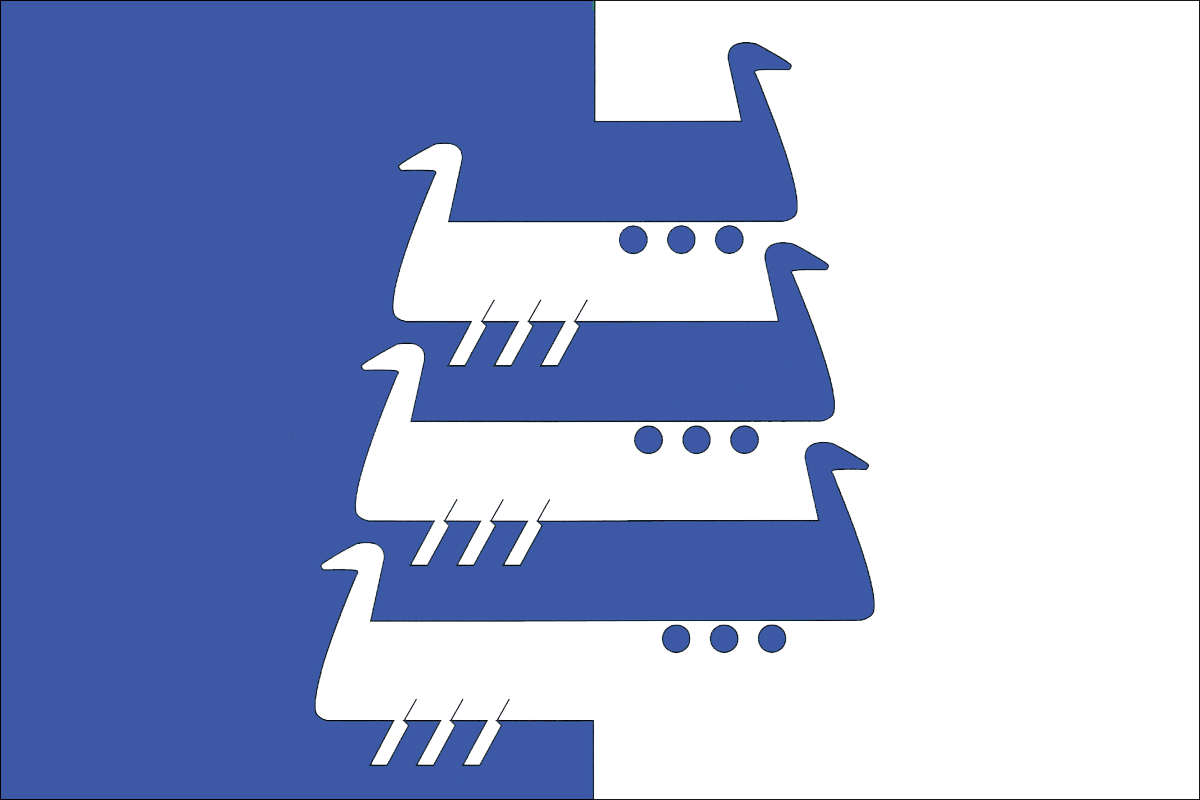
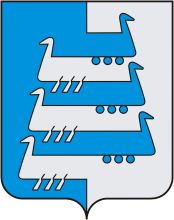
- Flag Coat of arms
- Interactive map of Navoloki
- Location of Navoloki Navoloki (Ivanovo Oblast)
- Coordinates: 57°28′N 41°58′E
- Country: Russia
- Federal subject: Ivanovo Oblast
- Administrative district: Kineshemsky District
- Founded: 1880s
- Town status since: 1938
- Elevation: 120 m (390 ft)

Population (2010 Census)
  - Total: 10,206
  - Estimate (2021): 8,167 (−20%)

Municipal status
  - Municipal district: Kineshemsky Municipal District
  - Urban settlement: Navolokskoye Urban Settlement
  - Capital of: Navolokskoye Urban Settlement
- Time zone: UTC+3 (MSK)
- Postal codes: 155830, 155831
- OKTMO ID: 24611104001
- Website: www.navoloki.ru

Navoloki (Russian: На́волоки) is a town in Kineshemsky District of Ivanovo Oblast, Russia, located on the right bank of the Volga River, 120 kilometers (75 mi) northeast of Ivanovo, the administrative center of the oblast. Population: 8,167 (2021 census); 10,206 (2010 census); 11,248 (2002 census); 12,434 (1989 Soviet census).

== History ==
It was founded in the 1880s as a settlement for workers engaged in the construction of a textile factory. It was granted town status in 1938.

== Administrative and municipal status ==
Within the framework of administrative divisions, Navoloki is subordinated to Kineshemsky District. Prior to the adoption of the Law #145-OZ On the Administrative-Territorial Division of Ivanovo Oblast in December 2010, it used to be incorporated separately as an administrative unit with the status equal to that of the districts.

As a municipal division, the town of Navoloki, together with eighteen rural localities in Kineshemsky District, is incorporated within Kineshemsky Municipal District as Navolokskoye Urban Settlement.
