= Yubileyny, Moscow Oblast =

Yubileyny Юбилейный
- Town (abolished)
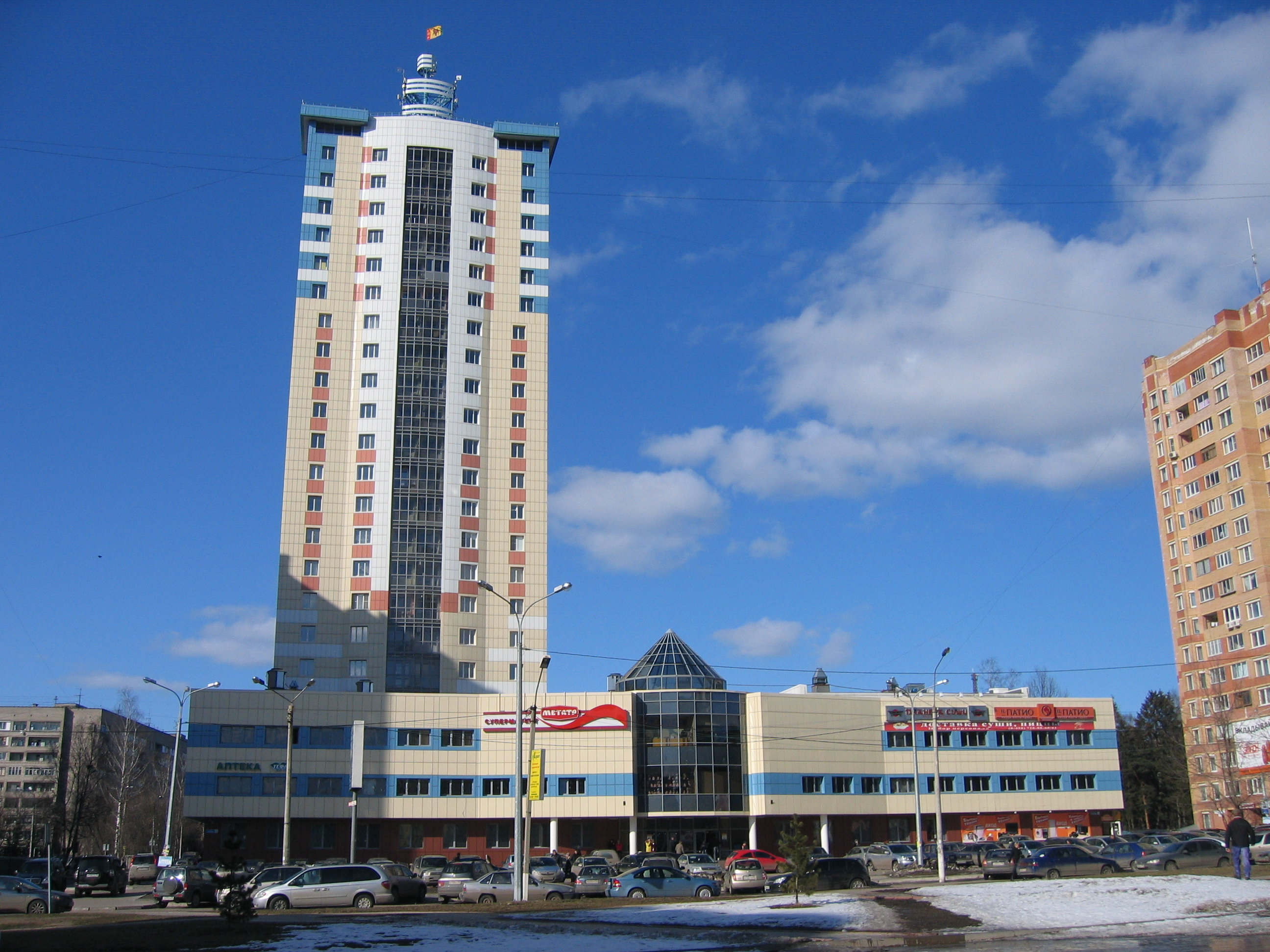
- In Yubileyny

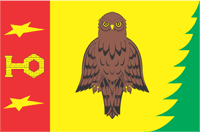
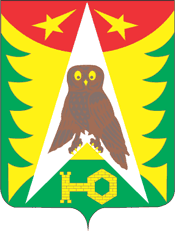
- Flag Coat of arms
- Interactive map of Yubileyny
- Location of Yubileyny Yubileyny (Moscow Oblast)
- Coordinates: 55°56′N 37°51′E
- Country: Russia
- Federal subject: Moscow Oblast
- Founded: 1972
- Town status since: May 25, 1992
- Abolished: June 7, 2014

Area
  - Total: 2.96 km^{2} (1.14 sq mi)
- Elevation: 160 m (520 ft)

Population (2010 Census)
  - Total: 33,237
  - Estimate (2015): 32,737 (−1.5%)
  - Density: 11,200/km^{2} (29,100/sq mi)

Administrative status
  - Subordinated to: Yubileyny Town Under Oblast Jurisdiction
  - Capital of: Yubileyny Town Under Oblast Jurisdiction

Municipal status
  - Urban okrug: Yubileyny Urban Okrug
  - Capital of: Yubileyny Urban Okrug
- Postal code: 141090–141092
- Website: www.yubyleyny.ru

Yubileyny (Russian: Юбиле́йный) was a town in Moscow Oblast, Russia, located 7 kilometers (4.3 mi) northeast of the Moscow Ring Road by Yaroslavl Highway, on the Klyazma River. It was merged into the surrounding city of Korolyov effective June 2014. Population: 33,237 (2010 census); 30,837 (2002 census).

== History ==
The town developed in an area where several villages stood in the past. Most of the town lands belonged to the Sheremetyevs, who bequeathed it to the Odoyevskys. The first mention of Bolshevo as a place that belonged to the Odoyevskys dates back to 1585. Another village whose territory partially overlapped with the town limits was Maksimkovo, which was first mentioned in 1618 as the property of the Lvovs family. Finally, the village of Lapino-Spasskoye, owned by boyar M. Godunov, was first mentioned in 1617.

In the 19th century, two railway lines were built in this region. These lines still exist and defined the southern and the eastern boundaries of the town before its abolition.

In September 1939, Moscow Military Engineering College was opened in Bolshevo. In 1946, the college was moved to Leningrad, and 4th Scientific Research Institute of the Ministry of Defense of the USSR was opened instead. The institute played an important role in developing the Soviet rocket and space technology. In 1972, 50th Tikhonravov Central Scientific Research of the Aerospace Forces opened here.

In the 1950s–1960s, two closed military communities were formed in this area. The communities grew and developed a limited civil infrastructure. By 1970, a third military community was established, and the civil infrastructure developed and improved. On November 24, 1972, a closed work settlement of Bolshevo-1 (Болшево-1), serving the troop unit #25840, was established.

In 1989, Bolshevo-1 was opened up, and on May 25, 1992, it was granted town status and renamed Yubileyny. Former military communities became residential microdistricts.

As Yubileyny grew, the nearby city of Korolyov also developed dynamically. Ultimately, with an exception of a 179-meter (587 ft) segment of a border with the Yaroslavl Highway, Yubileyny became completely surrounded by the territory of Korolyov. This segment constituted the northern border of a ribbon-shaped area of land that was annexed by the town with the sole purpose of establishing a border with an entity other than Korolyov. Nevertheless, effective June 2014, Yubileyny was merged into Korolyov and ceased to exist as a separate town.

== Administrative and municipal status ==
Within the framework of administrative divisions, it was incorporated as Yubileyny Town Under Oblast Jurisdiction—an administrative unit with the status equal to that of the districts. As a municipal division, Yubileyny Town Under Oblast Jurisdiction was incorporated as Yubileyny Urban Okrug.

== Sources ==
- Совет депутатов городского округа Юбилейный. Решение №226 от 23 ноября 2005 г. «Устав городского округа Юбилейный Московской области», в ред. Решения №15 от 22 апреля 2008 г. «О внесении изменений в Устав городского округа Юбилейный Московской области». Вступил в силу со дня официального опубликования. Опубликован: "Спутник", №3-4, 18 января 2006 г. (Council of Deputies of Yubileyny Urban Okrug. Decision #226 of November 23, 2005 Charter of Yubileyny Urban Okrug of Moscow Oblast, as amended by the Decision #15 of April 22, 2008 On Amending the Charter of Yubileyny Urban Okrug of Moscow Oblast. Effective as of the official publication date.).
- Московская областная Дума. Закон №11/2013-ОЗ от 31 января 2013 г. «Об административно-территориальном устройстве Московской области», в ред. Закона №249/2019-ОЗ от 29 ноября 2019 г. «О внесении изменений в Закон Московской области "Об административно-территориальном устройстве Московской области"». Вступил в силу на следующий день после официального опубликования (13 января 2013 г.). Опубликован: "Ежедневные Новости. Подмосковье", №24, 12 февраля 2013 г. (Moscow Oblast Duma. Law #11/2013-OZ of January 31, 2013 On the Administrative-Territorial Structure of Moscow Oblast, as amended by the Law #249/2019-OZ of November 29, 2019 On amending the Law of Moscow Oblast "On the Administrative-Territorial Structure of Moscow Oblast". Effective as of the day following the day of the official publication (January 13, 2013).).
- Губернатор Московской области. Постановление №123-ПГ от 28 сентября 2010 г. «Об учётных данных административно-территориальных и территориальных единиц Московской области», в ред. Постановления №252-ПГ от 26 июня 2015 г. «О внесении изменения в учётные данные административно-территориальных и территориальных единиц Московской области». Опубликован: "Информационный вестник Правительства МО", №10, 30 октября 2010 г. (Governor of Moscow Oblast. Resolution #123-PG of September 28, 2010 On the Inventory Data of the Administrative-Territorial and Territorial Units of Moscow Oblast, as amended by the Resolution #252-PG of June 26, 2015 On Amending the Inventory Data of the Administrative-Territorial and Territorial Units of Moscow Oblast. ).
- Московская областная Дума. Закон №189/2004-ОЗ от 24 декабря 2004 г. «О статусе и границе городского округа Юбилейный», в ред. Закона №16/2011-ОЗ от 10 февраля 2011 г «О внесении изменений в Закон Московской области "О статусе и границе городского округа Королёв" и Закон Московской области "О статусе и границе городского округа Юбилейный"». Вступил в силу со дня официального опубликования; утратил силу со 2 июня 2014 г.. Опубликован: "Ежедневные Новости. Подмосковье", №1–2, 11 января 2005 г. (Moscow Oblast Duma. Law #189/2004-OZ of December 24, 2004 On the Status and the Border of Yubileyny Urban Okrug, as amended by the Law #16/2011-OZ of February 10, 2011 On Amending the Law of Moscow Oblast "On the Status and the Border of Korolyov Urban Okrug" and the Law of Moscow Oblast "On the Status and the Border of Yubileyny Urban Okrug". Effective as of the day of the official publication; rescinded effective June 2, 2014.).
- Московская областная Дума. Закон №54/2014-ОЗ от 21 мая 2014 г. «Об объединении городов областного подчинения Московской области Королёв и Юбилейный и внесении изменения в Закон Московской области "Об административно-территориальном устройстве Московской области"». Вступил в силу через десять дней после официального опубликования. Опубликован: Официальный Интернет-портал Правительства Московской области http://www.mosreg.ru, 28 мая 2014 г. (Moscow Oblast Duma. Law #54/2014-OZ of May 21, 2014 On the Merger of Korolyov and Yubileyny Towns Under Oblast Jurisdiction in Moscow Oblast and Amending the Law of Moscow Oblast "On the Administrative-Territorial Structure of Moscow Oblast". Effective as of the day which is ten days after the official publication.).
- Московская областная Дума. Закон №53/2014-ОЗ от 21 мая 2014 г. «О преобразовании городского округа Королёв и городского округа Юбилейный, о статусе и установлении границы вновь образованного муниципального образования», в ред. Закона №87/2014-ОЗ от 15 июля 2014 г. «О внесении изменения в Закон Московской области "О преобразовании городского округа Королёв и городского округа Юбилейный, о статусе и установлении границы вновь образованного муниципального образования"». Вступил в силу через десять дней после официального опубликования, за исключением статей 4 и 5. Опубликован: Официальный Интернет-портал Правительства Московской области http://www.mosreg.ru, 23 мая 2014 г. (Moscow Oblast Duma. Law #53/2014-OZ of May 21, 2014 On the Transformation of Korolyov Urban Okrug and Yubileyny Urban Okrug, on the Status and the Border of the Newly Established Municipal Formation, as amended by the Law #87/2014-OZ of July 15, 2014 On Amending the Law of Moscow Oblast "On the Transformation of Korolyov Urban Okrug and Yubileyny Urban Okrug, on the Status and the Border of the Newly Established Municipal Formation". Effective as of the day which is ten days after the official publication, with the exception of Articles 4 and 5.).
