= 2022 Urengoy–Pomary–Uzhhorod pipeline explosion =

December 2022 gas pipeline leak in Chuvashia, Russia

- Date: 20 December 2022
- Time: c. 13:40 UTC+03:00
- Location: between Kalinino and Yambakhtino, Chuvashia, Russia; 55°36′52″N 46°49′11″E
- Cause: Gas leak during repair work
- Deaths: 3
- Injuries: 1

On 20 December 2022, an explosion occurred on the Russian Urengoy–Pomary–Uzhhorod gas pipeline, which supplies gas from Siberia to Europe through Ukraine.

The explosion occurred in Chuvashia, in the area of the gas pipeline between the villages of Kalinino and Yambakhtino, Vurnarsky District.

== Background ==
The Urengoy–Pomary–Uzhhorod export gas pipeline was built in the early 1980s. This pipeline transports Russian gas from Western Siberia to European countries. Near the Sudzha pumping station in Kursk Oblast, the gas pipeline crosses the border of the Russian Federation and Ukraine. Branches of the gas pipeline also go to the TurkStream and Central Asia.

The Sudzha gas pumping station, through which gas from this pipeline flows, now remains the only point on the Russian–Ukrainian border through which gas is still transiting. Gazprom supplies Russian gas for transit through the territory of Ukraine in the amount confirmed by the Ukrainian side through the Sudzha GIS – 43 million cubic meters on 20 December.

It was reported that before the explosion and ignition of the fire, "work was being carried out by the operating organization".

== Explosion ==
The gas explosion and subsequent fire occurred during scheduled repairs near the village of Yambakhtino, Vurnarsky District. The incident was reported at 13:44 local time. At 14:20, gas flaring at the emergency site was eliminated.

== Victims ==
The Ministry of Emergency Situations reported that as a result of an emergency on the gas pipeline, three gas service workers died, and one driver was injured.

== Aftermath ==
According to TASS, after reports of an explosion on a gas pipeline in Chuvashia, the price of gas in Europe rose to $1,200 per thousand cubic meters.

The local division of Gazprom stated after the explosion that the damaged section of the gas pipeline was promptly contained and that the gas is supplied to consumers in full through parallel pipelines.
