= Maksimkovo =

Maksimkovo Максимково
- Village
- Location within Ivanovo Oblast Location within Russia
- Coordinates: 57°10′N 42°59′E
- Country: Russia
- Region: Ivanovo Oblast
- District: Yuryevetsky District
- Time zone: UTC+3:00

Maksimkovo (Russian: Максимково) is a rural locality (a village) in Yuryevetsky District, Ivanovo Oblast, Russia. Population: 9 (2010 census);

== Geography ==
This rural locality is located 18 kilometres (11 mi) from Yuryevets (the district's administrative centre), 123 kilometres (76 mi) from Ivanovo (capital of Ivanovo Oblast) and 360 kilometres (220 mi) from Moscow. Santelevo is the nearest rural locality.
