= Yangiskain =

Yangiskain Янгискаин
- Selo
- Location within Bashkortostan Location within Russia
- Coordinates: 53°46′N 56°17′E
- Country: Russia
- Region: Bashkortostan
- District: Gafuriysky District
- Time zone: UTC+5:00

Yangiskain (Russian: Янгискаи́н; Bashkir: Яңғыҙҡайын, Yañğıźqayın) is a rural locality (a selo) and the administrative centre of Yangiskainsky Selsoviet, Gafuriysky District, Bashkortostan, Russia. The population was 888 as of 2010. There are 24 streets.

== Geography ==
Yangiskain is located 27 km southwest of Krasnousolsky (the district's administrative centre) by road. Ural is the nearest rural locality.
