= Basshi =

Basshi Басши
- Village
- Location in Kazakhstan
- Coordinates: 44°09′32″N 78°44′46″E
- Country: Kazakhstan
- Region: Jetisu Region
- District: Kerbulak District

Population (2009)
  - Total: 1,831
- Time zone: UTC+6 (Omsk Time)

Basshi (Kazakh: Басши, Basşi), previously Kalinino, is a village in Jetisu Region, in south-eastern Kazakhstan.
