= Teysin =

Village in Amursky District, Russia

Teysin, Teisin (Russian: Тейсин) is a village (Russian: посёлок) and a railway station on Komsomolsk–Dezhnyovka railway line in Elban urban-type settlement, Amursky District, Khabarovsk Krai, situated close to Lake Bolon. Army unit 55487 (GRAU), where an explosion killed one person and injured seven.

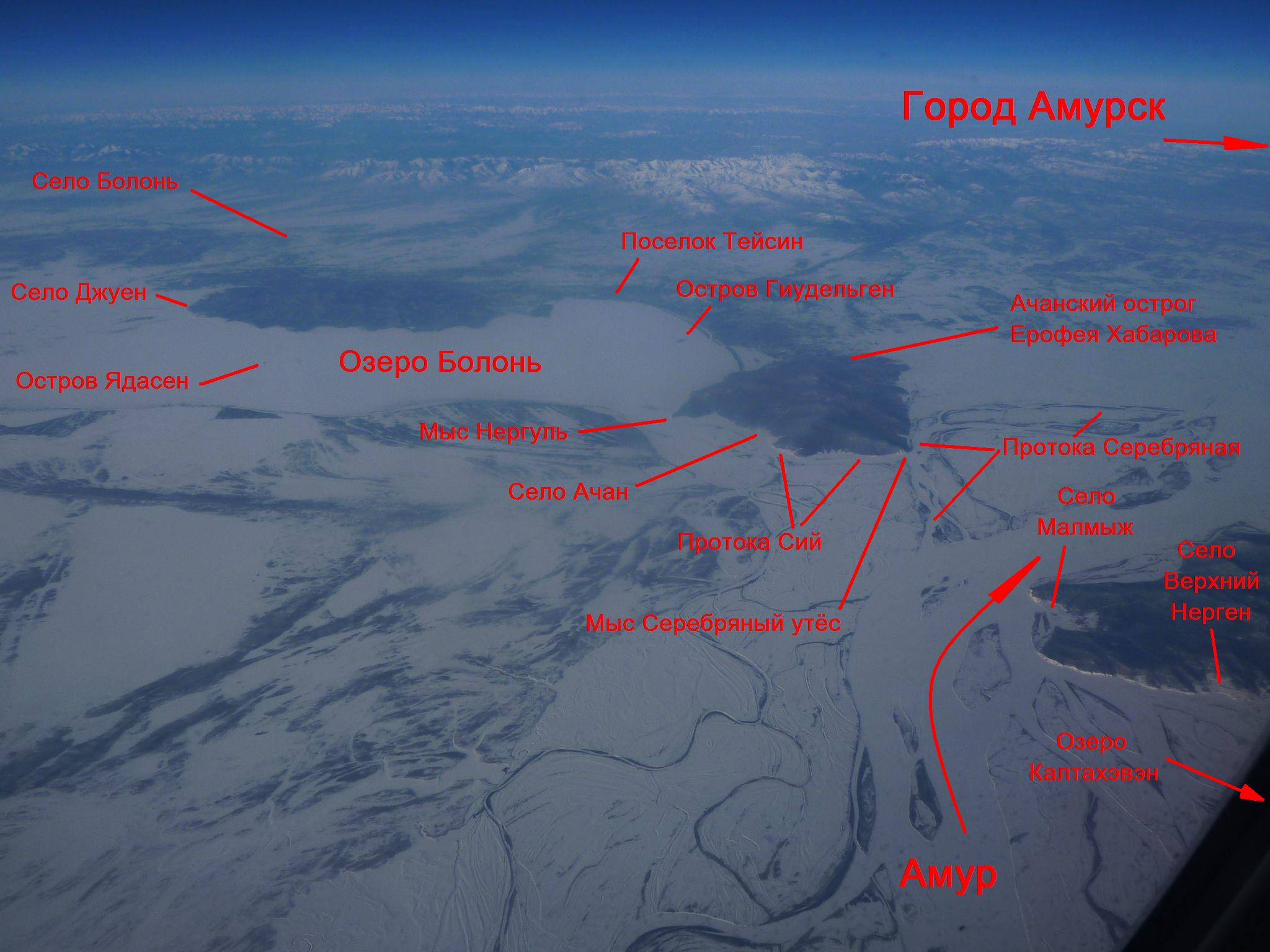
Lake Bolon and its surroundings
