= Second Central Research Institute of the Ministry of Defence of the Russian Federation =

Military research institute in Tver, Russia

Coordinates: 56°51′58″N 35°54′27″E

The Second Central Research Institute of the Ministry of Defence of the Russian Federation (Russian: 2-й центральный научно-исследовательский институт Министерства обороны Российской Федерации) is a Russian Ministry of Defence research institute in Tver, the administrative center of Tver Oblast, Russia. It enagages in aerospace research, including air defense systems.

It suffered a serious fire in April 2022, which killed six people and injured 27. Numerous news sites noted that the fire happened on the same day as the unexplained fire at the Dmitrievsky Chemical Plant in Kineshma.
