= Kalinino, Astrakhan Oblast =

Kalinino Калинино
- Selo
- Location within Astrakhan Oblast Location within Russia
- Coordinates: 46°20′N 48°52′E
- Country: Russia
- Region: Astrakhan Oblast
- District: Volodarsky District
- Time zone: UTC+4:00

Kalinino (Russian: Калинино) is a rural locality (a selo) and the administrative center of Kalininsky Selsoviet of Volodarsky District, Astrakhan Oblast, Russia. The population was 870 as of 2010. There are 6 streets.

== Geography ==
Kalinino is located on the Buzan River, 34 km (21 mi) southeast of Volodarsky (the district's administrative centre) by road. Narimanovo is the nearest rural locality.
