= Dmitrievsky Chemical Plant =

Chemical plant in Russia

Coordinates: 57.4227°N 42.1246°E

Dmitrievsky Chemical Plant (Russian: Дмитриевский химический завод) was a chemical plant located in Kineshma, the second-largest town in Ivanovo Oblast, Russia. It manufactured butyl acetate, and other products including industrial solvents.

It was engulfed in fire in April 2022. Numerous news sites noted that the fire happened on the same day as the unexplained fire at the Russian Aerospace Defense Forces' Central Research Institute in Tver.

On 26 May 2025, Ukrainian drones struck the facility, which manufacturers explosives and gunpowder for Russian military and civilian use.
