= Noginskaya, Syamzhensky District, Vologda Oblast =

Noginskaya Ногинская
- Village
- Location within Vologda Oblast Location within Russia
- Coordinates: 60°00′N 41°04′E
- Country: Russia
- Region: Vologda Oblast
- District: Syamzhensky District
- Time zone: UTC+3:00

Noginskaya (Russian: Ногинская) is a rural locality (a village) and the administrative center of Noginskoye Rural Settlement, Syamzhensky District, Vologda Oblast, Russia. The population was 650 as of 2002. There are 9 streets.

== Geography ==
Noginskaya is located 3 km south of Syamzha (the district's administrative centre) by road. Syamzha is the nearest rural locality.
