= Kalinino, Azerbaijan =

Kalinino
- Location within Azerbaijan
- Coordinates: 40°29′N 46°22′E
- Country: Azerbaijan
- Rayon: Goygol
- Time zone: UTC+4 (AZT)
  - Summer (DST): UTC+5 (AZT)

Kalinino is a village in the Goygol Rayon of Azerbaijan. It is named after Mikhail Kalinin, a Soviet revolutionary and a member of the Politburo of the Communist Party of the Soviet Union.
