= Noginskaya, Verkhovazhsky District, Vologda Oblast =

Noginskaya Ногинская
- Village
- Location within Vologda Oblast Location within Russia
- Coordinates: 60°47′N 42°42′E
- Country: Russia
- Region: Vologda Oblast
- District: Verkhovazhsky District
- Time zone: UTC+3:00

Noginskaya (Russian: Ногинская) is a rural locality (a village) and the administrative center of Kolengskoye Rural Settlement, Verkhovazhsky District, Vologda Oblast, Russia. The population was 160 as of 2002. There are 3 streets.

== Geography ==
Noginskaya is located 51 km northeast of Verkhovazhye (the district's administrative centre) by road. Fominskaya is the nearest rural locality.
