= Kalinino, Chuvashia =

Kalinino Калинино Нурăс
- Village
- Location within Russia
- Coordinates: 55°36′33″N 46°51′09″E
- Country: Russia
- Chuvashia: Vurnarsky District
- Population (2008): 1.500
- Time zone: UTC+4 (EET)
  - Summer (DST): UTC+4 (EEST)

Kalinino (Russian: Калинино; Chuvash: Нурăс, Nurăs) is a rural locality (a village) in Vurnarsky District, Chuvash Republic, (Russia).

== History ==
The diary of Sigismund von Herberstein, written in the 16th century, mentions this village.
