= Kineshemsky District =

Kineshemsky District Кинешемский район (Russian)
- District
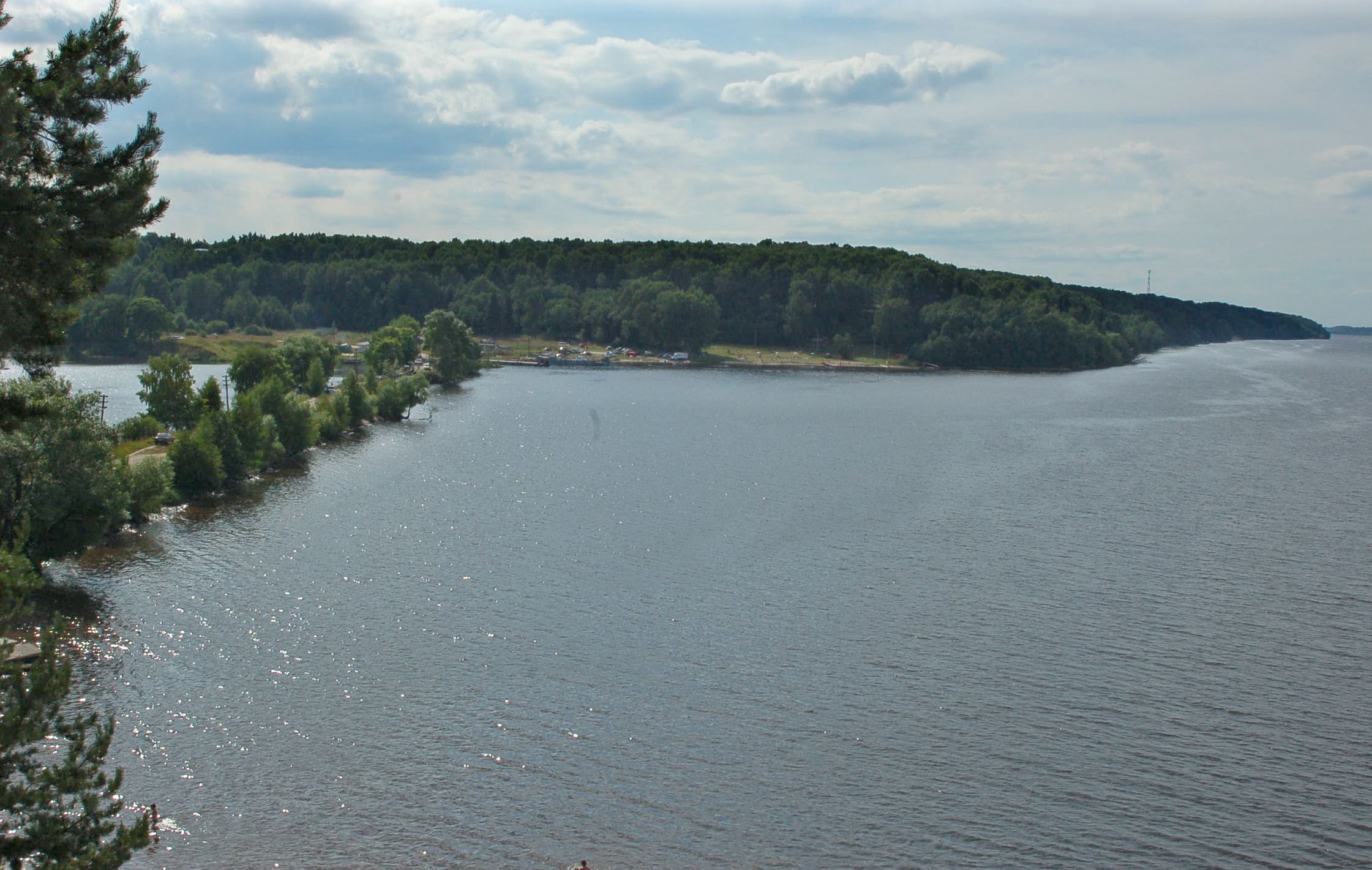
- Reshemka river mouth and the Volga River

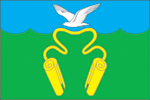
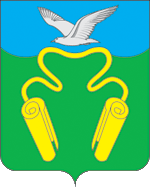
- Flag Coat of arms
- Location of Kineshemsky District in Ivanovo Oblast
- Coordinates: 57°27′01″N 42°06′54″E
- Country: Russia
- Federal subject: Ivanovo Oblast
- Administrative center: Kineshma

Area
  - Total: 1,583 km^{2} (611 sq mi)

Population (2010 Census)
  - Total: 23,258
  - Density: 14.69/km^{2} (38.05/sq mi)
  - Urban: 43.9%
  - Rural: 56.1%

Administrative structure
  - Inhabited localities: 232 rural localities

Municipal structure
  - Municipally incorporated as: Kineshemsky Municipal District
  - Municipal divisions: 1 urban settlements, 6 rural settlements
- Time zone: UTC+3 (MSK)
- OKTMO ID: 24611000
- Website: http://www.mrkineshma.ru/

Kineshemsky District (Russian: Ки́нешемский райо́н) is an administrative and municipal district (raion), one of the twenty-one in Ivanovo Oblast, Russia. It is located in the northeast of the oblast. The area of the district is 1,583 square kilometers (611 sq mi). Its administrative center is the town of Kineshma (which is not administratively a part of the district). Population: 18,402 (2021 census); 23,258 (2010 census); 27,650 (2002 Census); 30,805 (1989 Soviet census).

== Geography ==
Kineshemsky District is located in the northeast of Ivanovo Oblast, mostly on the right bank (south at this point) of the Volga River. About a fifth of the district is on the left (north) bank of the Volga, which runs west to east through the area. About 2/3 of the area is forested, and 1/3 is agricultural land on sandy and clay soils. Kineshemsky District is 90 km southeast of the city of Kostroma, and 400 km northeast of Moscow. The area measures 60 km (north-south), and 50 km (west-east); total area is 1,583 km2 (about 7% of Ivanovo Oblast). The administrative center, Kineshema, is on the south bank of the Volga, at the northwest entrance to the district.

The district is bordered on the north by Zavolzhsky District, on the east by Yuryevetsky District, on the south by Lukhsky District, and on the west by Vichugsky District.

== History ==
Archaeological records suggest that human settlement in Kineshemsky District began in the second or third century BC by a people of the Fatyanovo–Balanovo culture migrating from the west. They made polished-stone tools and were primarily hunters and fishers. By the first millennium AD the area was inhabited by the Meriya tribe of the Volga-Finns, raising cattle and beginning to build fortified towns. By the end of the first millennium a burial-mound culture of Krivachi Slavs had moved in with more advanced cattle-breeding and agricultural practices.

The earliest historical descriptions of Kineshemsky is from 1429, when an army of Kazan Tatars attacked and looted the area. In the early 1400s, Kineshema and the surrounding area became part of the Grand Duchy of Moscow. In the early 1600s it was twice invade by armies of the Polish King Sigismund III Vasa. In 1701, Peter the Great administratively reassigned Kineshemsky District to Arkhangelogorodskaya province; it was later reassigned to Yaroslavl province and Kostroma province until its final organization in Ivanovo Oblast.

== Administrative and municipal status ==
Within the framework of administrative divisions, Kineshemsky District is one of the twenty-one in the oblast. The town of Kineshma serves as its administrative center, despite being incorporated separately as an administrative unit with the status equal to that of the districts. Prior to the adoption of the Law #145-OZ On the Administrative-Territorial Division of Ivanovo Oblast in December 2010, the town of Navoloki was also incorporated separately from the district with the same status as Kineshma.

As a municipal division, the district is incorporated as Kineshemsky Municipal District. The Town of Kineshma is incorporated separately from the district as Kineshma Urban Okrug. The town of Navoloki is incorporated within the municipal district as Navolokskoye Urban Settlement.
