= Kineshma =

Town in Ivanovo Oblast, Russia

Kineshma Кинешма
- Town
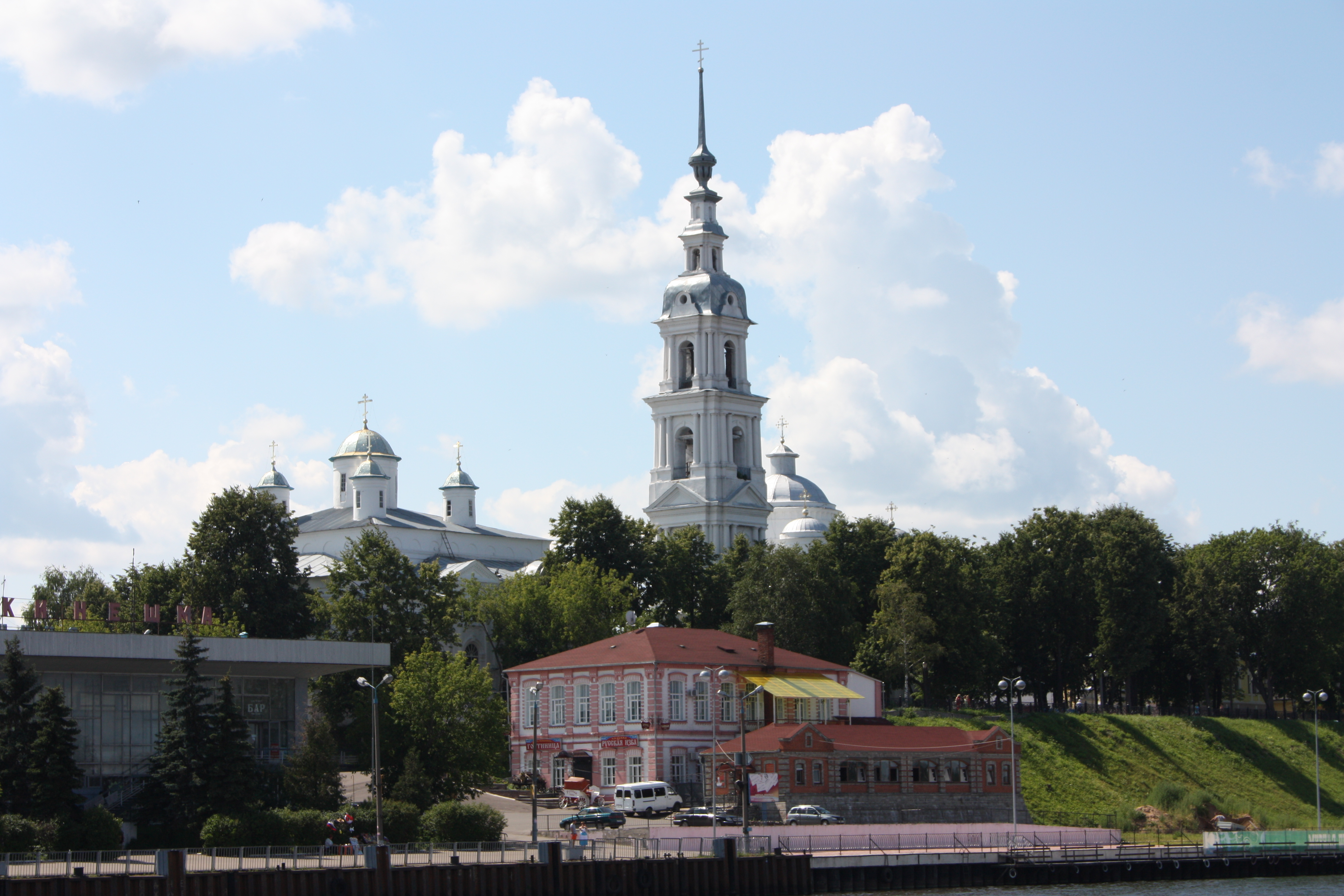
- View of Kineshma from the Volga

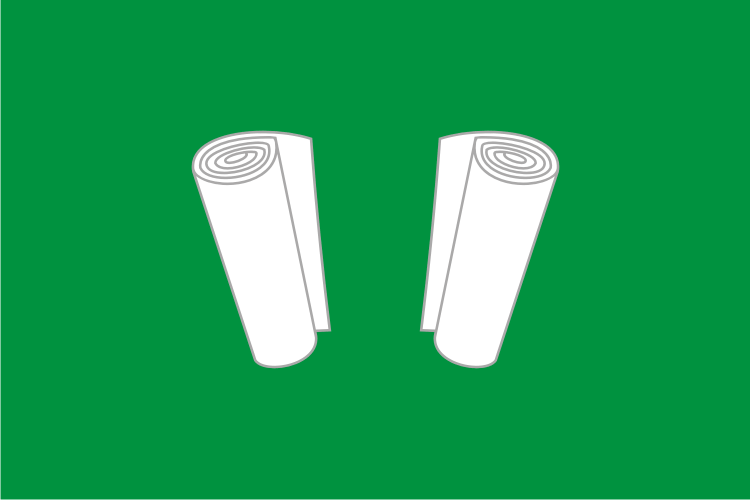
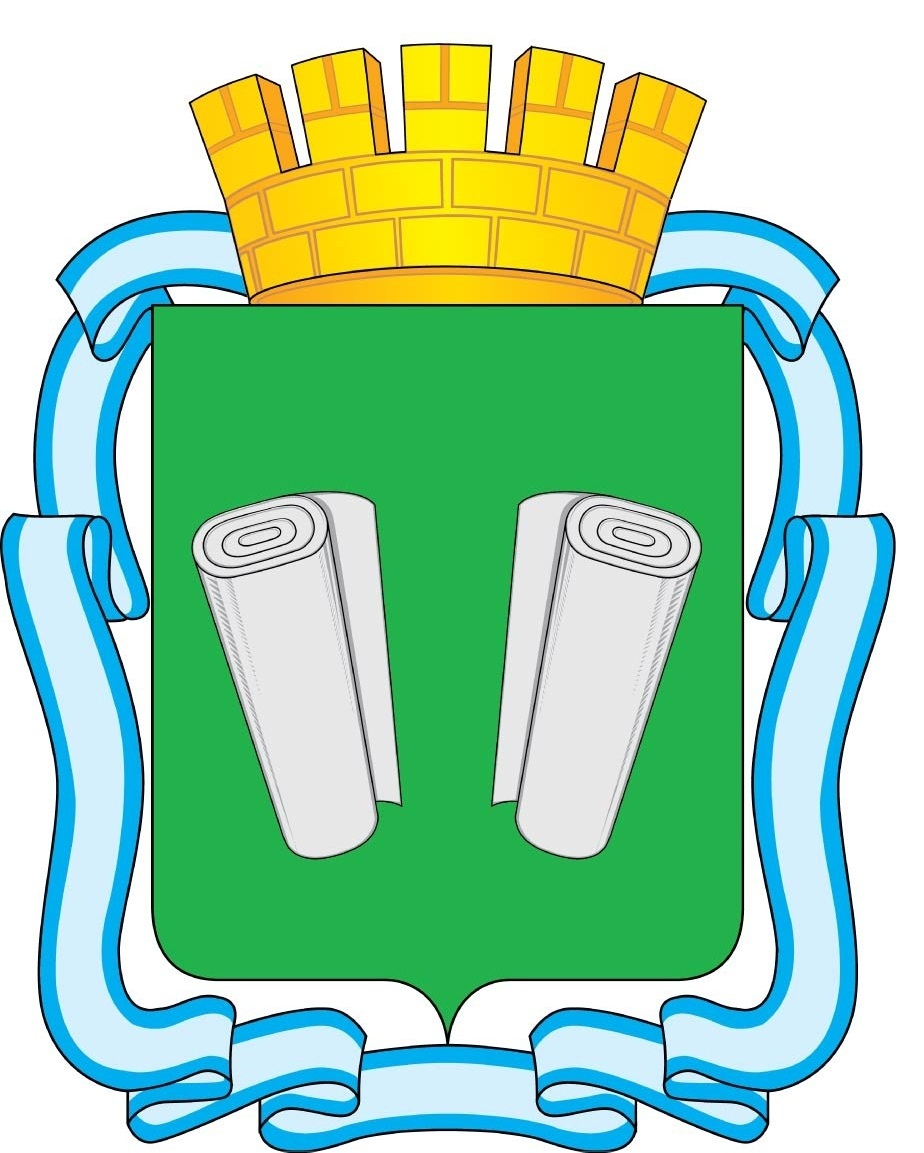
- Flag Coat of arms
- Interactive map of Kineshma
- Location of Kineshma Kineshma (Ivanovo Oblast)
- Coordinates: 57°26′N 42°08′E
- Country: Russia
- Federal subject: Ivanovo Oblast
- First mentioned: 1429

Area
  - Total: 49 km^{2} (19 sq mi)
- Elevation: 110 m (360 ft)

Population (2010 Census)
  - Total: 88,164
  - Estimate (2025): 74,197 (−15.8%)
  - Rank: 191st in 2010
  - Density: 1,800/km^{2} (4,700/sq mi)

Administrative status
  - Subordinated to: Town of Kineshma
  - Capital of: Kineshemsky District, Town of Kineshma

Municipal status
  - Urban okrug: Kineshma Urban Okrug
  - Capital of: Kineshma Urban Okrug, Kineshemsky Municipal District
- Time zone: UTC+3 (MSK)
- Postal code: 155800 - 155819
- Dialing code: +7 49331
- OKTMO ID: 24705000001
- Website: www.admkineshma.ru

Kineshma (Russian: Ки́нешма), the second-largest town in Ivanovo Oblast in Russia, sprawls for 15 kilometers (9.3 mi) along the Volga River, 335 kilometers north-east of Moscow. Population: 77,694 (2021 census); 88,164 (2010 census); 95,233 (2002 census); 105,037 (1989 Soviet census).

== Etymology ==
From a substrate Finno-Ugric language (cf. Meadow Mari: кыне ('kine', < Proto-Finno-Permic *känз), "hemp").

== History ==
Kineshma was first noticed as a posad in 1429. In 1504, Ivan III gave it to Prince Feodor Belsky, who escaped to Moscow from Lithuania and married Ivan's niece. Later on, Ivan the Terrible gave Kineshma to Ivan Petrovich Shuisky, but after the latter's death it was returned to the Tsar in 1587. In the 16th and 17th centuries, Kineshma was a major fishing center, which supplied sturgeon for the Tsar's table. In 1608, it was twice ravaged by the Poles. Throughout its history, Kineshma belonged to different Russian regions, including Archangelgorod Governorate, Yaroslavl Province of Saint Petersburg Governorate, and Moscow Governorate.

== Administrative and municipal status ==
Within the framework of administrative divisions, Kineshma serves as the administrative center of Kineshemsky District, even though it is not a part of it. As an administrative division, it is incorporated separately as the Town of Kineshma—an administrative unit with the status equal to that of the districts. As a municipal division, the Town of Kineshma is incorporated as Kineshma Urban Okrug.

== Economy ==
Since the 18th century, the town's main industry has been textile manufacturing. Like all the textile centers in Russia, the town's prosperity declined after the perestroika.

== Architecture ==
Kineshma's principal landmark is the Trinity Cathedral, built in 1838–1845 to a typical Neoclassical design. There are also several 18th-century churches in the town. The neighborhoods of Kineshma contain estates and museums of Alexander Ostrovsky, Alexander Borodin, and Fyodor Bredikhin.

In 2010, Kineshma was granted status of a town of historical significance.

== Religion ==
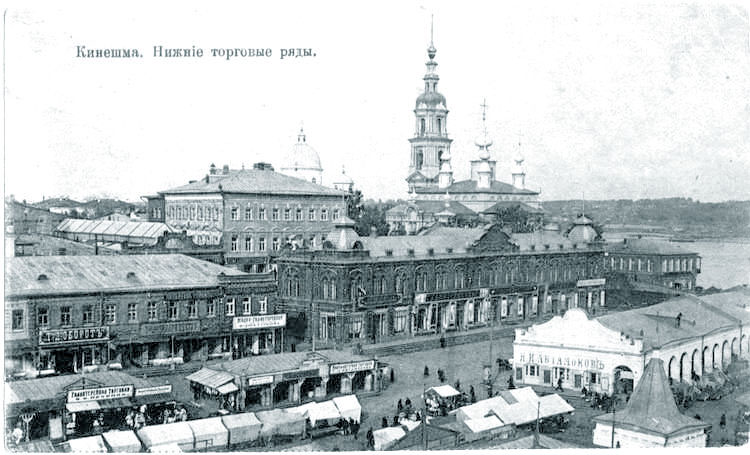
Kineshma before 1917

Currently there are eleven churches, nine of which are active, and three chapels.

== Notable people ==
- Alexander Borodin, composer and chemist
- Fyodor Bredikhin, astronomer
- Sergey Klyugin, Olympic high jumper
- Alexander Ostrovsky, writer
- Andrei Semenov, mixed martial artist
- Kostromin, musical artist

== Twin towns – sister cities ==
Kineshma is twinned with:

- Vantaa, Finland
- Baranavichy, Belarus
- Gudauta, Abkhazia (De facto; de jure part of Georgia)

== See also ==
- Kineshma Bridge
- Dmitrievsky Chemical Plant
