= List of rural localities in Ivanovo Oblast =

Map of Russia with Ivanovo Oblast highlighted

This is a list of rural localities in Ivanovo Oblast. Ivanovo Oblast (Russian: Ива́новская о́бласть, Ivanovskaya oblast) is a federal subject of Russia (an oblast). It had a population of 1,061,651 as of the 2010 Russian Census. Its three largest cities are Ivanovo (the administrative center), Kineshma, and Shuya. The principal center of tourism is Plyos. The Volga River flows through the northern part of the oblast.

== Furmanovsky District ==
Rural localities in Furmanovsky District:

- Akultsevo
- Babino
- Baksheyevo
- Baskakovo
- Belino
- Belkashevo
- Berezniki
- Boteyevo
- Bykovo
- Domovitsy
- Dulyapino
- Dushilovo
- Filikovka
- Fryankovo
- Golchanovo
- Ignatovskoye
- Isayevskoye
- Ivankovo
- Ivantsevo
- Kalikino
- Kalinino
- Karizino
- Khromtsovo
- Klimovo
- Kosogory
- Kotovo
- Lopatino
- Maksimovka
- Maluyevo
- Maryinskoye
- Medvedkovo
- Mikhalkovo
- Morozovo
- Mostechnoye
- Nikulskoye
- Novinki
- Novoye Pervoye
- Olyukovo
- Pankovo
- Petrushikha
- Pogost
- Privolye
- Renkovo
- Shevlyagino
- Shirokovo
- Shukhomosh
- Shulgino
- Skokovo
- Slabunino
- Snetinovo
- Sobantseyevo
- Starostino
- Stupino
- Verino
- Vondoga
- Vvedenskoye
- Vyazovskoye
- Yakovlevskoye
- Yermolino
- Yuryevskoye
- Zakharyino
- Zemlyanichny

== Gavrilovo-Posadsky District ==
Rural localities in Gavrilovo-Posadsky District:

- Berezhok
- Borodino
- Davydovskoye Bolshoye
- Davydovskoye Maloye
- Doutrovo
- Dubrovka
- Dubenki
- Glumovo
- Gorodishchi
- Irmes
- Ivankovsky
- Kholodikha
- Klyuchi
- Koshcheyevo
- Kostromikha
- Kozlovo
- Krutitsy
- Lbovo
- Lipovaya Roshcha
- Lobtsovo
- Lychevo
- Maltino
- Mankovo
- Mirslavl
- Morozovo
- Natalikha
- Nepotyagovo
- Novaya
- Novosyolka
- Ogrenevo
- Osanovets
- Pechishchi
- Petrovo-Gorodishche
- Petryaikha
- Podolets
- Putyatino
- Ratnitskoye
- Rykovskaya Novoselka
- Sankovo
- Serbilovo
- Shatry
- Shekshovo
- Shelbovo
- Shipovo
- Shipovo-Slobodka
- Skomovo
- Studenets
- Svoznya
- Teryayevo
- Timerevo
- Uronda Bolshaya
- Urusobino
- Vasilevo
- Vladychino
- Volodyatino
- Vyvozikha
- Yardenikha
- Yaryshevo
- Zagorodny
- Zagorye
- Zakomelye

== Ilyinsky District ==
Rural localities in Ilyinsky District:

- Abramovo
- Alekseyevskoye
- Ankovo
- Antushkovo
- Astafyevo
- Chistovo
- Churilovo Bolshoye
- Daniltsevo
- Denisovo Maloye
- Filyukovo
- Gari
- Golovishchi
- Gorbovo
- Goryashino
- Igrishchi
- Inarkhovo
- Isayevskoye
- Ivashevo
- Kablukovo
- Kaptsevo
- Khlebnitsy
- Kolchigino
- Kolokunovo
- Kolyagino
- Konstantinovo
- Kovarchino
- Kruttsy
- Ksty
- Kulachevo
- Kuzyayevo
- Lipkino
- Makaryino
- Malinovo
- Marino
- Martyanovo
- Martyukovo
- Maurino
- Minchakovo
- Nazornoye
- Nazherovo
- Nikitinka
- Nikolskoye
- Nikulkino
- Novoselka
- Olenino
- Osipovo
- Osvetino
- Perlevka
- Petrovo
- Pochepalovo
- Pogost Krest
- Polyanki
- Radino
- Rakshino
- Ratchino
- Redtsyno
- Retivtsevo
- Rozhnovo
- Satyrevo
- Schastlivka
- Senikha
- Shiryayevo
- Shchadnevo
- Shchennikovo
- Shumyatino
- Sidorovo
- Skokovo
- Spas-Gorodets
- Spas-Nerl
- Spirki
- Sverchkovo
- Telyakovo
- Torlyga
- Ulyanovo
- Veska
- Vorontsovo
- Voskresenskoye
- Vyazovitsy Malye
- Vyazovoye
- Vypolzovo
- Yakovlevo
- Yakovlevskoye
- Yakshino
- Zarubino
- Zaykovo

== Ivanovsky District ==
Rural localities in Ivanovsky District:

- Afanasovo
- Andreyevo
- Baglayevo
- Balakhonki
- Bedryayevo
- Belyanitsy
- Berkino
- Bibirevo
- Bogdanikha
- Boyevik
- Bryukhovo
- Bukharovo
- Bunkovo
- Burmakino
- Byakovo
- Chernorechensky
- Chetverkino
- Desyatskoye
- Dobrynskoye
- Dubniki
- Dubynino
- Dyakovo
- Fedosovo
- Gogolevo
- Golchanovo
- Golyakovo
- Gorbovo
- Gorentsovo
- Gorshkovo
- Govyadovo
- Grigorovo
- Gusevo
- Degtyarevo
- Deryabikha
- Ignatovo
- Ignattsevo
- Inevezh
- Ivankovo
- Ivantsevo
- Izmaylovo
- Kadnikovo
- Khabrovo
- Khrebtovo
- Khudynino
- Klintsevo
- Kochedykovo
- Kochnevo
- Kochorsky
- Kolbatskoye
- Kolyanovo
- Konokhovo
- Kottsyno
- Kozhevnikovo
- Krivtsovo
- Kruglovo
- Krutovo
- Kryukovo
- Kulikovo
- Kupalishchi
- Lebyazhy Lug
- Lesnoye
- Lomy
- Lysnovo
- Malinki
- Manultsevo
- Matrokhino
- Mikhalevo
- Mikshino
- Miltsevo
- Nefedyevo
- Nezhilovo
- Nikolskoye
- Nikulskoye
- Novino
- Novo-Talitsy
- Opolnoye
- Ormovo Bolshoye
- Ormovo Maloye
- Oshurikha
- Ozyorny
- Palmitsyno
- Paneyevo
- Pankratsevo
- Parfenyevo
- Perezhogino
- Peshchery, Ivanovo Oblast
- Pesochnevo
- Petrovskoye
- Pirogovo
- Pochinki
- Podvyaznovsky
- Polkhini
- Polunikha
- Praslovo
- Prislonikha
- Rodiontsovo
- Rogatino
- Rozhnovo
- Ryabinkino
- Safrontsevo
- Saltsevo
- Samsonovo
- Seminovo
- Semyonovskoye
- Sergiyevskoye
- Serkovo
- Shulgino
- Shurintsevo
- Sidorovskoye
- Sitnikovo
- Skalozubka
- Smenovo
- Stanovoye
- Stepanovo
- Stromikhino
- Tarasovo
- Teplovo
- Timoshikha
- Timoshkino
- Tolchkovo
- Tserkovnovo
- Tyuryukovo
- Ushakovka
- Uvod
- Vasilevo
- Vasilyevskoye
- Volzhanka
- Vostra
- Vyatchinki
- Vysokovo
- Yarlykovo
- Yasyunikha
- Yegory
- Yelyunino
- Yermolino
- Yurikovo
- Yuryevskoye
- Zakharyino
- Zalesye
- Zamaytsevo
- Zapolnovo
- Zarechye
- Zelyony Gorodok
- Zhary
- Zheleznodorozhny
- Zheltonosovo
- Zhukovo
- Zybikha

== Kineshemsky District ==
Rural localities in Kineshemsky District:

- Afachikha
- Akishevo
- Babenkovo
- Bakharevo
- Batmany
- Belousikha
- Belukhino
- Bogot
- Bulavino
- Bykovka
- Chernyakovo
- Dementyevo
- Dobrokhotovo
- Dobrynikha
- Dolgovo
- Dyachevo
- Dyukolovo
- Fatikha
- Galashino
- Galitskaya
- Gavrilovo
- Gavshino
- Georgiyevskoye
- Golovinskaya
- Gorki Bolshiye
- Gribtsovo
- Ilyinskoye
- Ishcheino
- Ivanikha Bolshaya
- Kislyachikha
- Kondrakovo
- Korikha
- Krasnogorsky
- Kraychikovo
- Krutitsy
- Kryuchikha
- Kuznechikha
- Kutunikha
- Lagunikha
- Laskarikha
- Lindy
- Lodygino
- Lugovoye
- Matveyevo
- Mukhortovo
- Mysy
- Noginskaya
- Norskoye
- Novoye Roshchino
- Oktyabrsky
- Oleshevo
- Ostashevo
- Pashkino
- Penki
- Pervomaysky
- Peshkovo
- Petrishchevo
- Pochinok
- Pospelikha Novaya
- Reshma
- Romanovo
- Samsonikha
- Semenkovo
- Shanino
- Shchechikha
- Sheronikha
- Shileksha
- Shikhovo
- Shirshovka
- Shumovskaya
- Sideryakha
- Sidorovka
- Sidorovskaya
- Skokovo
- Stanko
- Staroye Selo
- Stiberskoye
- Stoyanikha
- Stulovo
- Tarasikha
- Taratino
- Timonikha
- Tregubikha
- Ustnovo
- Vakhutki
- Vanyukovo
- Vashurovo
- Vereshchagino
- Voskresenskoye
- Votolino
- Vysokovo
- Yakimovo
- Yakushevo
- Yaryshkino
- Yefremovka
- Yermachikha
- Zakusikhino
- Zhurikhino
- Zimenki
- Zobnino
- Zuikha

== Komsomolsky District ==
Rural localities in Komsomolsky District:

- Afanasyevo
- Arkhangel
- Berezniki
- Brazino
- Butovo
- Chernyatino
- Chirikovo
- Chud
- Danilovo
- Degtyarka
- Dmitriyevskoye
- Dobrishchevo
- Filippkovo
- Golokhovo
- Golovets
- Gubino
- Gubtsevo
- Ivankovo
- Ivashkovo
- Kondyukovo
- Koptevo
- Koromyslovo
- Kozhevnikovo
- Krasnovo
- Kuleberyevo
- Markovo
- Marshovo
- Mikheyevo
- Mytishchi
- Nikolskoye
- Nikulino
- Novaya Usadba
- Novoselki
- Oktyabrsky
- Ostrov
- Pischugovo
- Pistsovo
- Ploskovo
- Podozyorsky
- Pripekovo
- Proskovo
- Putilova Gora
- Rozhdestvenno
- Rylkovo
- Savino
- Sedelnitsy
- Shatry
- Shchukovo
- Smolnitsy
- Sorokhta
- Sotnitsy
- Spasskoye
- Stanovoye
- Starovo
- Stepashevo
- Svatkovo
- Svetikovo
- Timonovo
- Tomarovo
- Torokhovo
- Tsypyshevo
- Tyugayevo
- Ustye
- Vorontsovo
- Vysokovo
- Yablonovo
- Yaksayevo
- Yanovo
- Yurtsevo
- Yurtsyno
- Yuryevo Pervoye

== Lezhnevsky District ==
Rural localities in Lezhnevsky District:

- Aladino
- Anisimovo
- Apanitsyno
- Arefino
- Arzhanovo
- Bolgovo Bolshoye
- Bolgovo Maloye
- Boristsevo
- Bushmanovo
- Bykovka
- Cherntsy
- Chistopolye
- Dorikha
- Dudino
- Dyagilkovo
- Dyupovo
- Grezino
- Gruznikha
- Gulikha
- Ignatikha
- Khoznikovo
- Klementyevo
- Knutikha
- Kolyshkino
- Kornevo
- Korovikha
- Kozino
- Krasny Ostrov
- Krutovo
- Kudrevatik
- Kukarino
- Kuneyevka
- Kuzmadenye
- Lezhnevskaya Roshcha
- Lopatino
- Malchikha
- Markovo Bolshoye
- Mikheyevskoye
- Moshchenki
- Mostovoye
- Novye Gorki
- Osinovka
- Ozherelyevo
- Panyutino
- Parshnevo
- Pavelkovo
- Perepechino Bolshoye
- Petrovskoye
- Plyasunikha
- Pochevino
- Podramenovo
- Poptsevo
- Rastilkovo Bolshoye
- Rastilkovo Maloye
- Romanki
- Sabinovo
- Saburikha
- Samushino
- Shashmurka
- Shchapovo
- Shchipousikha
- Shilykovo
- Shparikha
- Skokovo
- Smerdovo
- Stafurovo
- Stanki
- Stary Karachun
- Stepannikovo
- Stoyakovo
- Stoyantsevo
- Strekalovo
- Stupkino
- Takovets
- Telegino
- Ukhtokhma
- Uvalyevo
- Velikodvorskoye
- Vesnevo
- Volkovo
- Volotovo
- Voskresenskoye
- Vyatkovo
- Vyselikha
- Vysokovo
- Yakovlevo
- Yamanovo
- Yefremovo
- Yesino
- Zhukovitsy
- Zlatoust

== Lukhsky District ==
Rural localities in Lukhsky District:

- Andreyevskaya
- Babino
- Bakunikha
- Blagoveshchenye
- Blinikha
- Burkovo
- Buyanovo
- Demenino
- Derevenki
- Dobritsa
- Drenevskaya
- Fedosovo
- Fedotikha
- Filino
- Fyodorovskaya
- Glazunovo
- Gorodilovo
- Gorodok
- Ignatyevskaya
- Kalikino
- Karpovo
- Khudynskoye
- Klimovskaya
- Kokourovo
- Krigouzovo
- Krikovshchina
- Kruzhkovo
- Kunino
- Kurbatikha
- Kurilovo
- Kuzhlevo
- Kuzmino
- Kuznechikha
- Makarikha
- Manshino Bolshoye
- Martynovo
- Medvedevo
- Nastasyino
- Nazarkovo
- Onoshkovo
- Osokovo
- Pavlitsevo
- Pestovo
- Petelnikovo
- Petrovo
- Pirogovo
- Porzdni
- Presnyachikha
- Rusino
- Rusinovskaya
- Ryabinkino
- Ryabovo
- Serkovka
- Slobodki
- Smirenino
- Sokolskoye
- Sorokino
- Starinskaya
- Steblevo
- Stepurino
- Surovtsy
- Svarukha
- Timiryazevo
- Vadishchevo
- Vasinskaya
- Vishnya
- Vorsino
- Voskresenskoye Novoye
- Voskresenskoye Staroye
- Vysokovo
- Yelovki
- Yelovo
- Zabolotye
- Zaprudnovo

== Palekhsky District ==
Rural localities in Palekhsky District:

- Anyutino
- Barskoye
- Baryshki
- Belikovo
- Bogatishchi
- Bokari
- Borodino
- Brazhnovo
- Burdkinka
- Dorki Bolshiye
- Dorki Malye
- Dubokolikha
- Dyagilevo
- Fedurikha
- Furovo
- Gorodilovo
- Grigorovo
- Ivankovo
- Ivanovo-Ilyino
- Kazakovo
- Khotyonovo
- Khrulyovo
- Kletino
- Kolzaki
- Konoplyanovo
- Kostyukhino
- Kovshovo
- Krasnaya
- Krasnoye
- Kruttsy
- Kuznechikha
- Levino
- Linyovo
- Lodygino
- Lomaksino
- Luzhki
- Malinovo
- Matyukino
- Maydakovo
- Medvezhye
- Melyoshino
- Morygino
- Myasnikovo
- Nazaryevo
- Novaya
- Novoselki
- Okultsevo
- Onuchevo
- Osinovets
- Ovsyanitsy
- Pakhotino
- Panovo
- Penki
- Petrovo
- Pochinok
- Podolino
- Pomogalovo
- Ponkino
- Potanino
- Prudovo
- Ramenye
- Roglovo
- Rudilnitsy
- Rybino
- Sakulino
- Sergeyevo
- Shalimovo
- Shchavyevo
- Shogotovo
- Soymitsy
- Svergino
- Telichnovo
- Teplovo
- Timenka
- Ulyanikha
- Verzyakino
- Yakovlevo
- Yeremkino
- Yurkino
- Zalesye
- Zhukovo

== Pestyakovsky District ==
Rural localities in Pestyakovsky District:

- Alyokhino
- Bolobino
- Borisovo
- Cherepovo
- Chernovskaya
- Dubovichye
- Filyata
- Galashovo
- Gogino
- Igoshino
- Khaneyevka
- Kokusha
- Kortrokhovo
- Kozlikha
- Kurmysh
- Lavrushkino
- Lukanino
- Mikhaylovskaya
- Mordvinovo
- Mugreyevsky Bor
- Neverovo-Sloboda
- Nikulino
- Nizhny Landekh
- Osinki
- Palagino
- Parshino
- Pimanovo
- Pogorelka
- Pokhmelino
- Polyakovo
- Prudki
- Pureshka
- Sezukh
- Shalayevo
- Shalganovo
- Shcherbinino
- Shlykovo
- Skoba
- Strelka Bolshaya
- Vashkino
- Verbino
- Zarubino

== Privolzhsky District ==
Rural localities in Privolzhsky District:

- Andreyevskoye
- Annenskoye
- Antonovo
- Barashovo
- Blaginino
- Boriskovo
- Danilkovo
- Drachevo
- Dudkino
- Fedorishche
- Filisovo
- Georgiyevskoye
- Gorki
- Gorki-Chirikovy
- Gorshkovo
- Gryazki
- Igolkovo
- Ingar
- Ivanovskoye
- Ivashkovo
- Kasimovka
- Khrapunovo
- Kolyshino
- Korovino
- Kosikovo
- Kotelnitsy
- Krasinskoye
- Krenevo
- Kunestino
- Leshchyovo
- Maltsevo
- Melenki
- Meskoritsy
- Mikhalevo
- Milovka
- Mitino
- Nedanki
- Nogino
- Novinskoye
- Novoye
- Parushevo
- Penki
- Peremilovo
- Petrovskoye
- Petrunino
- Poddubnovo
- Polozishche
- Popkovo
- Poverstnoye
- Rogachyovo
- Rozhdestvenno
- Ryapolovo
- Rylkovo
- Ryspayevo
- Sandyrevo
- Sarayevo
- Seliverstovo
- Severtsevo
- Shalyapino
- Sherbinino
- Shiryaikha
- Stolovo
- Tarkhanovo
- Tolpygino
- Tserkovnoye
- Ukladnitsy
- Utyos
- Vasilchinino
- Vasilevo
- Vasilyevskoye
- Vaskin Potok
- Vygolovo

== Puchezhsky District ==
Rural localities in Puchezhsky District:

- Baskino
- Borisenki
- Bukino
- Chabyshevo Nizhneye
- Deduslovo
- Dmitriyevo Bolshoye
- Drozdikha
- Dubnovo
- Dvoynichikha
- Dynino
- Galashino
- Gari
- Gremyachevo Verkhneye
- Gubinskaya
- Gusarinki
- Ilya-Vysokovo
- Ivanikha
- Kameshki Bolshiye
- Kandaurovo
- Klimushino Bolshoye
- Komarovo
- Korablyovo
- Korovayevo
- Kosolapikha
- Krupino
- Letnevo
- Lezhebokovo
- Lgovo, Ivanovo Oblast
- Likhunikha
- Lisikha
- Listye
- Lukinskaya
- Lukonino
- Luzhinki
- Marishchi
- Mekhovo
- Melnichnoye
- Mortki
- Mostovka
- Pauchikha
- Pervunikha
- Petrovo
- Pleshakovo
- Pogorelka
- Polozikha
- Poperekovo
- Povalikhino
- Privalovo
- Protasikha Bolshaya
- Pyatnitsa-Vysokovo
- Rassadino
- Repino Maloye
- Savikha
- Segot
- Shpenevo
- Shubino
- Sivkovo
- Slinkovo
- Smagino
- Solovyovo
- Sorvachevo
- Stolbunikha
- Umekovo
- Vasilkovo
- Verbikha
- Vereshchagino
- Vorontsovo
- Voynovo
- Yablonovo
- Zarayskoye
- Zateikha

== Rodnikovsky District ==
Rural localities in Rodnikovsky District:

- Aferkovo
- Akhidovka
- Aleshkovo
- Belovskoye
- Berdyukovo
- Berezniki
- Bobrokovo
- Bolotnovo
- Boltino
- Borshchevo
- Bukovo
- Demenovo
- Derevenki
- Fedorkovo
- Filisovo
- Ganino
- Gari
- Glazkovo
- Golygino
- Gordyakovka
- Isayevo
- Ivanikha
- Khlyabovo
- Khmelniki
- Khripelevo
- Klintsevo
- Klygino
- Kochigino
- Korobeykino
- Koshcheyevo
- Kotikha
- Koyevo
- Krasnovo
- Krasnoye
- Kudelino
- Kutilovo
- Kuzmino
- Lomy Malye
- Malchikha
- Malyshevo
- Melechkino
- Melikha
- Melnikovo
- Mezhi
- Mikhaylovskoye
- Mostishchi
- Nikonikha
- Nikulskoye
- Novinskoye
- Orekhovo
- Ostretsovo
- Ovintsy
- Parakhino
- Parkhachevo
- Parskoye
- Petrovo
- Polovchinnovo
- Postninsky
- Prigorodnoye
- Prislonikha
- Rastavlevo
- Romanovo
- Savkovo
- Sennikovo
- Shubino
- Sitkovo
- Skrylovo
- Slobodka
- Sosnovets
- Stanovoye
- Staroye Selo
- Tatyanikha
- Taymanikha
- Tezinka
- Tsepochkino
- Turdeyevo
- Ushakovo
- Varvarikha
- Vedrovo
- Vorontsovo
- Vypolzovo
- Yudinka
- Zakharikha
- Zhzhonikha

== Savinsky District ==
Rural localities in Savinsky District:

- Agrofenino
- Afanasovo
- Aleksino
- Aleshovo
- Antilokhovo
- Arkhipovka
- Artemikha
- Balbino
- Chertoviki
- Ferdechakovo
- Filyandino
- Glubokovo
- Goryachevo
- Grishakovo
- Ilyinskaya
- Isakovo
- Klintsevo
- Kondrakovo
- Koptevo
- Korzino
- Krapivnik
- Krapivnovo
- Krasnitsy
- Krasnovo
- Krivonosovo
- Krutovo
- Kstovo Bolshoye
- Kurmysh
- Kuzemkino
- Lemeshki
- Lukyanovo
- Maksimtsevo
- Maloye Klochkovo
- Maly Takovets
- Matrenkino
- Medvedevo
- Mekhovitsy
- Melyushevo
- Mezhdurechensk
- Mikhalevo
- Milyukovo
- Morozovo
- Mosyakovo
- Myasnikovo
- Naberezhnaya
- Nelsha
- Nepotyagovo
- Nikitino
- Nikittsyno
- Novo
- Novoye Goryanovo
- Novoye Leushino
- Obolsunovo
- Obyedovo
- Panino
- Pelgusovo
- Pelkhovo
- Pershino
- Podlesikha
- Pokrovskoye
- Polki
- Poloma
- Puchkovo
- Pyryevka
- Repnovo
- Sakhtysh
- Sanniki
- Seltso
- Shapkino
- Shchapino
- Shchapovka
- Shestunikha
- Sinyaya Osoka
- Sitnikovo
- Slabnevo
- Srubovo
- Stolbishchi
- Stupino
- Teplyaki
- Voronikha
- Voskresenskoye
- Voznesenye
- Yakovlevo
- Yamanovo
- Yermakovo
- Yushkovo
- Zalesye
- Zakhartsevo
- Zhabrikha

== Shuysky District ==
Rural localities in Shuysky District:

- Abramovo
- Aistovo
- Afanasyevskoye
- Alyoshevo
- Anfimovo
- Arefino
- Aristovo
- Avdeyevo
- Banevo
- Bildyukhino
- Chashchevo
- Chechkino-Bogorodskoye
- Chernevo
- Cherntsy
- Chernyatkino
- Chizhovo
- Dekrino
- Dorozhayevo
- Dunilovo
- Dvorishki Bolshiye
- Fatyanovo
- Fedotovo
- Filatovka
- Filino
- Gari
- Gnezdilovo
- Goritsy
- Goryanovo
- Isakovo
- Ivantsevo
- Ivonino
- Kachalovo
- Kameshkovo
- Kharitonovo
- Kitovo
- Kleshchyovka
- Klochkovo
- Knyazhevo
- Kochnevo
- Korovino
- Koshcheyevo
- Kosyachevo
- Krapivnovo
- Krasnoarmeyskoye
- Krokhino Novoye
- Kudryakovo
- Kuryaninovo
- Kuznetsovo
- Lazarevo
- Lekunino
- Litvintsevo
- Maklakovo
- Markovo
- Mazalovo
- Menshchikovo
- Mikhalkovo
- Milyukovka
- Mizgino
- Motovo
- Myagkovo
- Nikitinskoye
- Nikulnikovo
- Novaya
- Odintsovo
- Orlovo
- Ostapovo
- Ovsyannikovo
- Ozerkovo
- Palkino
- Panteleyevo
- Panyutino
- Parshigino
- Pavlyukovo
- Peremilovo
- Perevesnovo
- Petrilovo
- Plekhovo
- Polki
- Priliv
- Pustosh
- Rusilovo
- Seberna
- Semeykino
- Semyonovo
- Sennikovo
- Serednevo Bolshoye
- Sergeyevo
- Sevastyanovo
- Slobodka
- Studentsy
- Styazhkovo
- Teplyakovo
- Trutnevo
- Tsentralny
- Vasilevo
- Vasilyevskoye
- Vikhrevo
- Voronezh
- Vvedenye
- Yegoriy
- Yelizarovo
- Yurkino
- Zakharovo
- Yakimanna
- Yakushevo
- Zaprudnovo
- Zatkhlino
- Zelyony Bor
- Zimenki
- Zmeyevo

== Teykovsky District ==
Rural localities in Teykovsky District:

- Alferovka
- Alferyevo
- Berezovik
- Berlovo
- Biryukovo
- Bogatyrevo
- Bolshiye Vyazovitsy
- Bolshoye Klochkovo
- Bolshoye Stupkino
- Bulgakovo
- Burakovo
- Busharikha
- Dashkovo
- Derevnya-Ivan
- Domotkanovo
- Doronino
- Dumino
- Fedino
- Golyanishchevo
- Gorki
- Gridino
- Grigoryevo
- Grozilovo
- Kharino
- Kharitonovo
- Khomutovo
- Kirkeyevo
- Shiryayevo
- Skvortsovo
- Stebachyovo
- Subbochevo
- Sukhovo
- Sunovo
- Terentyevo
- Testovo
- Ureyevo
- Vantino
- Varvarino
- Vysokovo
- Yakshino
- Yarishnevo
- Yelkhovka
- Zakharovo
- Zernilovo
- Zinovo
- Zolotnikovskaya Pustyn

== Verkhnelandekhovsky District ==
Rural localities in Verkhnelandekhovsky District:

- Abrosovo
- Aksenovo
- Baranovo
- Bazhenovo
- Bortnoye Bolshoye
- Brusovo Bolshoye
- Chikhachevo
- Danilovo
- Daryino
- Detkovo
- Donovo
- Filatovo
- Gogoli
- Gruzdenik
- Isakovo
- Ivankovo
- Kasharyata
- Khmelino
- Khudyakovo
- Kislyata
- Knyazkovo
- Kosikovo
- Kozitsyno
- Krikovskaya
- Kromy
- Krutovskaya
- Krutye
- Lykovo
- Maklakovo
- Malninskaya
- Markovo
- Maryino
- Moshkovo
- Mutovino
- Myt
- Osoki
- Ploskiryata
- Pogorelka
- Proselki
- Serkovo
- Shatunovo
- Simakovo
- Smetanino
- Solodikhino
- Starilovo
- Tatyanikha
- Tokarevo
- Vanino
- Vershinikha
- Yakutino
- Yefremovo
- Zadnyaya
- Zaglupanye
- Zaseka
- Zenino
- Zhernokovo
- Zubyata

== Vichugsky District ==
Rural localities in Vichugsky District:

- Ankino
- Artyushino
- Borodkino
- Borshchevka
- Borutikha
- Bratilovo
- Bulatikha
- Bystri
- Chertovishchi
- Dachnoye
- Demidovo
- Dolmatikha
- Duravino
- Dyagelikha
- Fedyayevo
- Galuyevskaya
- Gavrilkovo
- Gaydarovo Bolshoye
- Glukhovo
- Gridinskaya
- Ilyino
- Isupovskaya
- Kadyevo
- Kashino
- Kazarkino
- Khrenovo
- Kirikino
- Klyginskaya
- Korovino Nizhneye
- Korovino Verkhneye
- Kosachevo
- Krasny Oktyabr
- Krasnye Gory
- Kuznetsovo
- Lazunikha
- Lemeshikha
- Lomy Bolshiye
- Lukhovets
- Makatovo
- Martynikha
- Matveikha
- Nasakino
- Nefyodovo
- Nikulino
- Okulovo
- Osinovka
- Ovechkino
- Ovinovo
- Pandino
- Pistsovo Novoye
- Potekhino
- Putkovskaya
- Rastvorovo
- Razdolye
- Rokotovo
- Ropotovo
- Roshma
- Rozhstvo
- Rychkovskaya
- Semigorye
- Semyonovskoye
- Shekholdino
- Shlyaykovo
- Siniye Gari
- Skalinka
- Sopegino
- Sorokino
- Soshniki
- Staraya Golchikha
- Starostino
- Stepanikha
- Strelka
- Strubishchi
- Timoshikha
- Tolkovo
- Tropinskoye
- Tsepiki
- Ustinovo
- Vandyshevo
- Vaskovo
- Vekhtevo
- Volkovo
- Volynevo
- Vorobyovo
- Vyalikha
- Yanino
- Yashino
- Yasnevo
- Yezhovka
- Yurino
- Zabelskoye
- Zabolotye
- Zakharikha
- Zalesye
- Zarubino
- Zherebchikha
- Zherebtsovo
- Zhiryatino
- Zolotilovo
- Zolotovka

== Yuzhsky District ==
Rural localities in Yuzhsky District:

- Borok
- Domnino
- Glushitsy
- Gorki
- Gruzdevo
- Irykhovo
- Istoki
- Izotino
- Kashino
- Kholuy
- Khotiml
- Kisharikha
- Kitaynovo
- Kochergino
- Kolyagino
- Kosiki
- Kosovka
- Kruglovo
- Lamna Bolshaya
- Luchkino
- Lukino
- Maksimovo
- Maltsevo
- Manshino
- Mikheyevo
- Mordovskoye
- Mosta
- Mugreyevo-Dmitriyevskoye
- Mugreyevo-Nikolskoye
- Nagornovo
- Nefyodovo
- Nikulikha
- Novoklyazminskoye
- Pavlitsy
- Petushki
- Pogorelka
- Preobrazhenskoye
- Pustyn
- Rebrovo
- Rusino
- Ryapolovo
- Selishchi
- Soino
- Spasskoye
- Suzemye
- Talitsy
- Tarakanovo
- Tarantayevo
- Tarasikha
- Travino
- Volokobino
- Vzvoz
- Yemelyanovo

== Yuryevetsky District ==
Rural localities in Yuryevetsky District:

- Andronikha
- Baranikha
- Barsuki
- Benkino
- Churkino Bolshoye
- Demidovka
- Dorki
- Fedorkovo
- Gar
- Grishino
- Ilyinskoye
- Kamenniki
- Kokuyevo
- Kostyayevo Bolshoye
- Kourtsevo
- Lobany
- Lyandikha
- Maksimkovo
- Makhlovo
- Maurikha
- Mikhaylovo
- Mokhnevo
- Nikitino
- Novlenskoye
- Novoye Zhukovo
- Obzherikha
- Ovchinnikovo
- Parnikovo
- Pelevino
- Petushikha
- Podvyazkino
- Prokino
- Razdyakonikha
- Roshvenskoye
- Ruchey
- Santelevo
- Seredkino
- Shchekotikha
- Shikhovo
- Sobolevo
- Talitsa
- Tikhon-Volya
- Ustinikha
- Vankovo
- Vasilyevka
- Yamskaya
- Yelnat
- Yuryevo
- Zharki
- Zhary
- Zhukovka
- Zyablovo

== Zavolzhsky District ==
Rural localities in Zavolzhsky District:

- Ananyino
- Babtsyno
- Bolotnikovo
- Boristsevo
- Borshchevka
- Bredikhino
- Butovo
- Dolmatovsky
- Fominskoye
- Golochelovo
- Goltsovka
- Gorodishche
- Ivashevo
- Ilyinskoye
- Khokhloma
- Kholmy
- Khotenovo
- Kinino
- Kistega
- Knyazevo
- Kolshevo
- Kornilovo
- Korotikha
- Krapivki
- Kuren
- Lobantsevo
- Logintsevo
- Lykovo
- Markushi
- Martynikha
- Mera
- Militino
- Nelidovo
- Nikola-Mera
- Novaya Derevnya
- Novlyanskoye
- Ovsyanitsy
- Patrareyka
- Platkovo
- Podelovo
- Posulovo
- Porozovo
- Pyreshevo
- Ruposovo
- Stepanovo
- Toropikha
- Trostnikovo
- Vershinino
- Vertluzhnoye
- Vodomerovo
- Voronino
- Vorontsovo
- Vozdvizhenye
- Yemelyanovo
- Yesiplevo
- Zarechny
- Zhazhlevo
- Zubtsovo

== See also ==
- Lists of rural localities in Russia
