= Radino, Ivanovo Oblast =

Radino Радино
- Village
- Location within Ivanovo Oblast Location within Russia
- Coordinates: 56°54′N 39°57′E
- Country: Russia
- Region: Ivanovo Oblast
- District: Ilyinsky District
- Time zone: UTC+3:00

Radino (Russian: Радино) is a rural locality (a village) in Ilyinsky District, Ivanovo Oblast, Russia. Population: 12 (2010 census); 13 (2002 census);

== Geography ==
This rural locality is located 14 kilometres (8.7 mi) from Ilyinskoye-Khovanskoye (the district's administrative centre), 62 kilometres (39 mi) from Ivanovo (capital of Ivanovo Oblast) and 191 kilometres (119 mi) from Moscow. Veska is the nearest rural locality.
