= Golyakovo =

Golyakovo Голяково
- Village
- Location within Ivanovo Oblast Location within Russia
- Coordinates: 56°51′N 40°58′E
- Country: Russia
- Region: Ivanovo Oblast
- District: Ivanovsky District
- Time zone: UTC+3:00

Golyakovo (Russian: Голяково) is a rural locality (a village) in Ivanovsky District, Ivanovo Oblast, Russia. Population: 35 (2010 census);

== Geography ==
This rural locality is located 14 km from Ivanovo (the district's administrative centre and capital of Ivanovo Oblast) and 239 km from Moscow. Gorshkovo is the nearest rural locality.
