= Kashino, Yuzhsky District =

Kashino Кашино
- Village
- Location within Ivanovo Oblast Location within Russia
- Coordinates: 56°42′N 42°04′E
- Country: Russia
- Region: Ivanovo Oblast
- District: Yuzhsky District
- Time zone: UTC+3:00

Kashino (Russian: Кашино) is a rural locality (a village) in Yuzhsky District, Ivanovo Oblast, Russia. Population: 35 (2010 census);

== Geography ==
This rural locality is located 14 kilometres (8.7 mi) from Yuzha (the district's administrative centre), 75 kilometres (47 mi) from Ivanovo (capital of Ivanovo Oblast) and 291 kilometres (181 mi) from Moscow. Gruzdevo is the nearest rural locality.
