= Zhary, Ivanovsky District, Ivanovo Oblast =

Zhary Жары
- Village
- Location within Ivanovo Oblast Location within Russia
- Coordinates: 56°58′N 41°15′E
- Country: Russia
- Region: Ivanovo Oblast
- District: Ivanovsky District
- Time zone: UTC+3:00

Zhary (Russian: Жары) is a rural locality (a village) in Ivanovsky District, Ivanovo Oblast, Russia. Population: 5 (2010 census);

== Geography ==
This rural locality is located 18 km from Ivanovo (the district's administrative centre and capital of Ivanovo Oblast) and 258 km from Moscow. Fedosovo is the nearest rural locality.
