= Demenino =

Demenino Деменино
- Village
- Location within Ivanovo Oblast Location within Russia
- Coordinates: 57°02′N 42°07′E
- Country: Russia
- Region: Ivanovo Oblast
- District: Lukhsky District
- Time zone: UTC+3:00

Demenino (Russian: Деменино) is a rural locality (a village) in Lukhsky District, Ivanovo Oblast, Russia. Population: 9 (2010 census);

== Geography ==
This rural locality is located 9 kilometres (5.6 mi) from Lukh (the district's administrative centre), 70 kilometres (43 mi) from Ivanovo (capital of Ivanovo Oblast) and 308 kilometres (191 mi) from Moscow. Kurilovo is the nearest rural locality.
