= Ovechkino, Ivanovo Oblast =

Ovechkino Овечкино
- Village
- Location within Ivanovo Oblast Location within Russia
- Coordinates: 57°16′N 41°38′E
- Country: Russia
- Region: Ivanovo Oblast
- District: Vichugsky District
- Time zone: UTC+3:00

Ovechkino (Russian: Овечкино) is a rural locality (a village) in Vichugsky District, Ivanovo Oblast, Russia. Population: 14 (2010 census);

== Geography ==
This rural locality is located 18 km from Vichuga (the district's administrative centre), 51 km from Ivanovo (capital of Ivanovo Oblast) and 294 km from Moscow. Osinovka is the nearest rural locality.
