= Luchkino =

Luchkino Лучкино
- Village
- Location within Ivanovo Oblast Location within Russia
- Coordinates: 56°32′N 41°38′E
- Country: Russia
- Region: Ivanovo Oblast
- District: Yuzhsky District
- Time zone: UTC+3:00

Luchkino (Russian: Лучкино) is a rural locality (a village) in Yuzhsky District, Ivanovo Oblast, Russia. Population: 18 (2010 census);

== Geography ==
This rural locality is located 23 kilometres (14 mi) from Yuzha (the district's administrative centre), 65 kilometres (40 mi) from Ivanovo (capital of Ivanovo Oblast) and 262 kilometres (163 mi) from Moscow. Redkino is the nearest rural locality.
