= Novo-Talitsy =

Novo-Talitsy Ново-Талицы
- Village
- Location within Ivanovo Oblast Location within Russia
- Coordinates: 57°00′N 40°51′E
- Country: Russia
- Region: Ivanovo Oblast
- District: Ivanovsky District
- Time zone: UTC+3:00

Novo-Talitsy (Russian: Ново-Талицы) is a rural locality (a village) in Ivanovsky District, Ivanovo Oblast, Russia. Population:7,955 (2021 census);

== Geography ==
This rural locality is located 7 km from Ivanovo (the district's administrative centre and capital of Ivanovo Oblast) and 240 km from Moscow. Golchanovo is the nearest rural locality.
