= Peshchery, Ivanovo Oblast =

Peshchery Пещеры
- Village
- Location within Ivanovo Oblast Location within Russia
- Coordinates: 56°53′N 40°50′E
- Country: Russia
- Region: Ivanovo Oblast
- District: Ivanovsky District
- Time zone: UTC+3:00

Peshchery (Russian: Пещеры) is a rural locality (a village) in Ivanovsky District, Ivanovo Oblast, Russia. Population: 23 (2010 census);

== Geography ==
This rural locality is located 14 km from Ivanovo (the district's administrative centre and capital of Ivanovo Oblast) and 233 km from Moscow. Votola is the nearest rural locality.
