= Ishcheino =

Ishcheino Ищеино
- Village
- Location within Ivanovo Oblast Location within Russia
- Coordinates: 57°28′N 42°03′E
- Country: Russia
- Region: Ivanovo Oblast
- District: Kineshemsky District
- Time zone: UTC+3:00

Ishcheino (Russian: Ищеино) is a rural locality (a village) in Kineshemsky District, Ivanovo Oblast, Russia. Population: 32 (2010 census);
