= Zakharyino, Ivanovsky District, Ivanovo Oblast =

Zakharyino Захарьино
- Village
- Location within Ivanovo Oblast Location within Russia
- Coordinates: 56°56′N 41°14′E
- Country: Russia
- Region: Ivanovo Oblast
- District: Ivanovsky District
- Time zone: UTC+3:00

Zakharyino (Russian: Захарьино) is a rural locality (a village) in Ivanovsky District, Ivanovo Oblast, Russia. Population: 123 (2010 census);

== Geography ==
This rural locality is located 18 km from Ivanovo (the district's administrative centre and capital of Ivanovo Oblast) and 257 km from Moscow. Zhirokhovo is the nearest rural locality.
