= Ushakovka, Ivanovo Oblast =

Ushakovka Ушаковка
- Village
- Location within Ivanovo Oblast Location within Russia
- Coordinates: 57°00′N 41°14′E
- Country: Russia
- Region: Ivanovo Oblast
- District: Ivanovsky District
- Time zone: UTC+3:00

Ushakovka (Russian: Ушаковка) is a rural locality (a village) in Ivanovsky District, Ivanovo Oblast, Russia. Population: 14 (2010 census);

== Geography ==
This rural locality is located 17 kilometres (11 mi) from Ivanovo (the district's administrative centre and capital of Ivanovo Oblast) and 260 kilometres (160 mi) from Moscow. Rogatino is the nearest rural locality.
