= Lomy Bolshiye =

Lomy Bolshiye Ломы Большие
- Village
- Location within Ivanovo Oblast Location within Russia
- Coordinates: 57°17′N 41°40′E
- Country: Russia
- Region: Ivanovo Oblast
- District: Vichugsky District
- Time zone: UTC+3:00

Lomy Bolshiye (Russian: Ломы Большие) is a rural locality (a village) in Vichugsky District, Ivanovo Oblast, Russia. Population: 218 (2010 census);
