= Gusevo, Ivanovo Oblast =

Gusevo Гусево
- Village
- Location within Ivanovo Oblast Location within Russia
- Coordinates: 57°04′N 40°39′E
- Country: Russia
- Region: Ivanovo Oblast
- District: Ivanovsky District
- Time zone: UTC+3:00

Gusevo (Russian: Гусево) is a rural locality (a village) in Ivanovsky District, Ivanovo Oblast, Russia. Population: 42 (2010 census);

== Geography ==
This rural locality is located 21 km from Ivanovo (the district's administrative centre and capital of Ivanovo Oblast) and 235 km from Moscow. Zabolotye is the nearest rural locality.
