= Bryukhovo, Ivanovo Oblast =

Bryukhovo Брюхово
- Selo
- Location within Ivanovo Oblast Location within Russia
- Coordinates: 57°06′N 40°41′E
- Country: Russia
- Region: Ivanovo Oblast
- District: Ivanovsky District
- Time zone: UTC+3:00

Bryukhovo (Russian: Брюхово) is a rural locality (a selo) in Ivanovsky District, Ivanovo Oblast, Russia. Population: 141 (2010 census);

== Geography ==
This rural locality is located 21 km from Ivanovo (the district's administrative centre and capital of Ivanovo Oblast) and 239 km from Moscow. Stepanovo is the nearest rural locality.
