= Safrontsevo =

Safrontsevo Сафронцево
- Village
- Location within Ivanovo Oblast Location within Russia
- Coordinates: 56°59′N 41°13′E
- Country: Russia
- Region: Ivanovo Oblast
- District: Ivanovsky District
- Time zone: UTC+3:00

Safrontsevo (Russian: Сафронцево) is a rural locality (a village) in Ivanovsky District, Ivanovo Oblast, Russia. Population: 11 (2010 census);

== Geography ==
This rural locality is located 15 kilometres (9.3 mi) from Ivanovo (the district's administrative centre and capital of Ivanovo Oblast) and 258 kilometres (160 mi) from Moscow. Kulikovo is the nearest rural locality.
