= Ormovo Maloye =

Ormovo Maloye Орьмово Малое
- Village
- Location within Ivanovo Oblast Location within Russia
- Coordinates: 56°56′N 41°09′E
- Country: Russia
- Region: Ivanovo Oblast
- District: Ivanovsky District
- Time zone: UTC+3:00

Ormovo Maloye (Russian: Орьмово Малое) is a rural locality (a village) in Ivanovsky District, Ivanovo Oblast, Russia. Population: 48 (2010 census);

== Geography ==
This rural locality is located 12 km from Ivanovo (the district's administrative centre and capital of Ivanovo Oblast) and 252 km from Moscow. Ormovo Bolshoye is the nearest rural locality.
