= Ozyorny, Ivanovo Oblast =

Ozyorny Озёрный
- Selo
- Location within Ivanovo Oblast Location within Russia
- Coordinates: 57°09′N 40°58′E
- Country: Russia
- Region: Ivanovo Oblast
- District: Ivanovsky District
- Time zone: UTC+3:00

Ozyorny (Russian: Озёрный) is a rural locality (a selo) in Ivanovsky District, Ivanovo Oblast, Russia. Population: 795 (2010 census); 860 (2002 census);

== Geography ==
This rural locality is located 18 km from Ivanovo (the district's administrative centre and capital of Ivanovo Oblast) and 256 km from Moscow. Maksaki is the nearest rural locality.
