= Konokhovo =

Konokhovo Конохово
- Village
- Location within Ivanovo Oblast Location within Russia
- Coordinates: 57°03′N 40°53′E
- Country: Russia
- Region: Ivanovo Oblast
- District: Ivanovsky District
- Time zone: UTC+3:00

Konokhovo (Russian: Конохово) is a rural locality (a village) in Ivanovsky District, Ivanovo Oblast, Russia. Population: 201 (2010 census); 66 (2002 census);

== Geography ==
This rural locality is located 9 km from Ivanovo (the district's administrative centre and capital of Ivanovo Oblast) and 245 km from Moscow. Uvod is the nearest rural locality.
