= Vasilevo, Ivanovo Oblast =

Vasilevo Василево
- Village
- Location within Ivanovo Oblast Location within Russia
- Coordinates: 56°59′N 41°11′E
- Country: Russia
- Region: Ivanovo Oblast
- District: Ivanovsky District
- Time zone: UTC+3:00

Vasilevo (Russian: Василево) is a rural locality (a village) in Ivanovsky District, Ivanovo Oblast, Russia. Population: 59 (2010 census);

== Geography ==
This rural locality is located 13 km from Ivanovo (the district's administrative centre and capital of Ivanovo Oblast) and 256 km from Moscow. Kulikovo is the nearest rural locality.
