= Vasilyevskoye, Ivanovo Oblast =

Vasilyevskoye Васильевское
- Village
- Location within Ivanovo Oblast Location within Russia
- Coordinates: 57°00′N 40°00′E
- Country: Russia
- Region: Ivanovo Oblast
- District: Ivanovsky District
- Time zone: UTC+3:00

Vasilyevskoye (Russian: Васильевское) is a rural locality (a village) in Ivanovsky District, Ivanovo Oblast, Russia. Population: 23 (2010 census);

== Geography ==
This rural locality is located 18 km from Ivanovo (the district's administrative centre and capital of Ivanovo Oblast) and 262 km from Moscow. Sidorovskoye is the nearest rural locality.
