= Gorbovo, Ivanovsky District, Ivanovo Oblast =

Gorbovo Горбово
- Village
- Location within Ivanovo Oblast Location within Russia
- Coordinates: 57°02′N 41°15′E
- Country: Russia
- Region: Ivanovo Oblast
- District: Ivanovsky District
- Time zone: UTC+3:00

Gorbovo (Russian: Горбово) is a rural locality (a village) in Ivanovsky District, Ivanovo Oblast, Russia. Population: 7 (2010 census);

== Geography ==
This rural locality is located 19 km from Ivanovo (the district's administrative centre and capital of Ivanovo Oblast) and 263 km from Moscow. Belousikha is the nearest rural locality.
