= Kruglovo, Ivanovsky District, Ivanovo Oblast =

Kruglovo Круглово
- Village
- Location within Ivanovo Oblast Location within Russia
- Coordinates: 56°55′N 40°54′E
- Country: Russia
- Region: Ivanovo Oblast
- District: Ivanovsky District
- Time zone: UTC+3:00

Kruglovo (Russian: Круглово) is a rural locality (a village) in Ivanovsky District, Ivanovo Oblast, Russia. Population: 171 (2010 census);

== Geography ==
This rural locality is located 8 km from Ivanovo (the district's administrative centre and capital of Ivanovo Oblast) and 238 km from Moscow. Degtyarevo is the nearest rural locality.
