= Yermolino, Ivanovsky District, Ivanovo Oblast =

Yermolino Ермолино
- Village
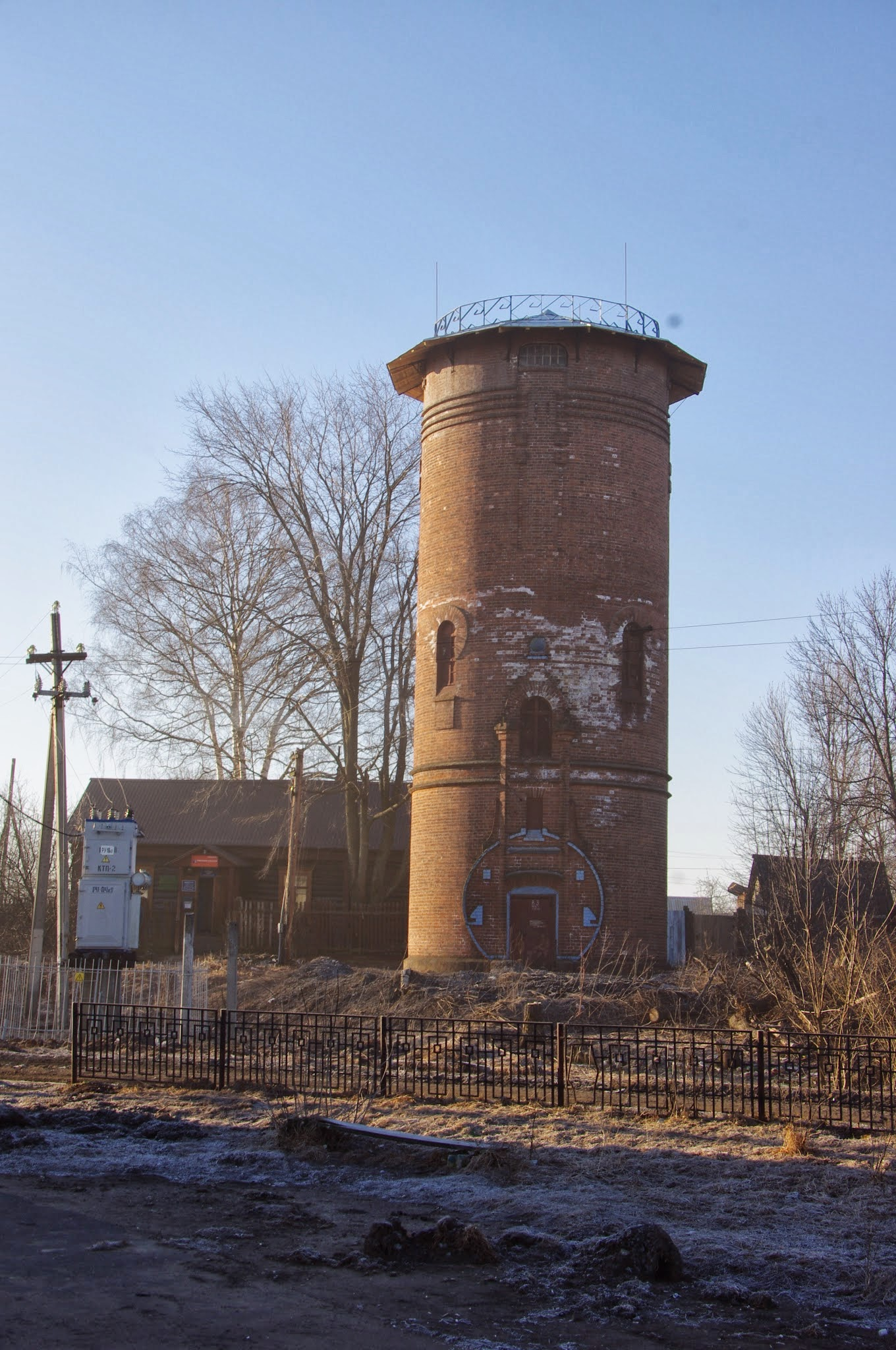

- Location within Ivanovo Oblast Location within Russia
- Coordinates: 57°05′N 41°15′E
- Country: Russia
- Region: Ivanovo Oblast
- District: Ivanovsky District
- Time zone: UTC+3:00

Yermolino (Russian: Ермолино) is a rural locality (a village) in Ivanovsky District, Ivanovo Oblast, Russia. Population: 474 (2010 census);

== Geography ==
This rural locality is located 20 km from Ivanovo (the district's administrative centre and capital of Ivanovo Oblast) and 265 km from Moscow. Maritsyno is the nearest rural locality.
