= Maltsevo, Yuzhsky District =

Maltsevo Мальцево
- Village
- Location within Ivanovo Oblast Location within Russia
- Coordinates: 56°24′N 41°59′E
- Country: Russia
- Region: Ivanovo Oblast
- District: Yuzhsky District
- Time zone: UTC+3:00

Maltsevo (Russian: Мальцево) is a rural locality (a village) in Yuzhsky District, Ivanovo Oblast, Russia. Population: 20 (2010 census);

== Geography ==
This rural locality is located 20 kilometres (12 mi) from Yuzha (the district's administrative centre), 91 kilometres (57 mi) from Ivanovo (capital of Ivanovo Oblast) and 279 kilometres (173 mi) from Moscow. Podyelovo is the nearest rural locality.
