= Volokobino =

Volokobino Волокобино
- Village
- Location within Ivanovo Oblast Location within Russia
- Coordinates: 56°41′N 41°38′E
- Country: Russia
- Region: Ivanovo Oblast
- District: Yuzhsky District
- Time zone: UTC+3:00

Volokobino (Russian: Волокобино) is a rural locality (a selo) in Yuzhsky District, Ivanovo Oblast, Russia. Population: 200 (2010 census);

== Geography ==
This rural locality is located 26 kilometres (16 mi) from Yuzha (the district's administrative centre), 53 kilometres (33 mi) from Ivanovo (capital of Ivanovo Oblast) and 266 kilometres (165 mi) from Moscow. Ileykino is the nearest rural locality.
