= Timoshikha, Ivanovsky District, Ivanovo Oblast =

Timoshikha Тимошиха
- Village
- Location within Ivanovo Oblast Location within Russia
- Coordinates: 57°05′N 41°18′E
- Country: Russia
- Region: Ivanovo Oblast
- District: Ivanovsky District
- Time zone: UTC+3:00

Timoshikha (Russian: Тимошиха) is a rural locality (a village) in Ivanovsky District, Ivanovo Oblast, Russia. Population: 200 (2010 census);

== Geography ==
This rural locality is located 23 kilometres (14 mi) from Ivanovo (the district's administrative centre and capital of Ivanovo Oblast) and 268 kilometres (167 mi) from Moscow. Dobrynskoye is the nearest rural locality.
