= Rogatino =

Rogatino Рогатино
- Village
- Location within Ivanovo Oblast Location within Russia
- Coordinates: 56°59′N 41°15′E
- Country: Russia
- Region: Ivanovo Oblast
- District: Ivanovsky District
- Time zone: UTC+3:00

Rogatino (Russian: Рогатино) is a rural locality (a village) in Ivanovsky District, Ivanovo Oblast, Russia. Population: 27 (2010 census);

== Geography ==
This rural locality is located 18 kilometres (11 mi) from Ivanovo (the district's administrative centre and capital of Ivanovo Oblast) and 260 kilometres (160 mi) from Moscow. Ushakovka is the nearest rural locality.
