= Zalesye, Palekhsky District, Ivanovo Oblast =

Zalesye Залесье
- Village
- Location within Ivanovo Oblast Location within Russia
- Coordinates: 56°47′N 42°02′E
- Country: Russia
- Region: Ivanovo Oblast
- District: Palekhsky District
- Time zone: UTC+3:00

Zalesye (Russian: Залесье) is a rural locality (a village) in Palekhsky District, Ivanovo Oblast, Russia. Population: 5 (2010 census);

== Geography ==
This rural locality is located 12 kilometres (7.5 mi) from Palekh (the district's administrative centre), 69 kilometres (43 mi) from Ivanovo (capital of Ivanovo Oblast) and 293 kilometres (182 mi) from Moscow. Yarkino is the nearest rural locality.
