= Degtyarevo, Ivanovo Oblast =

Degtyarevo Дегтярево
- Village
- Location within Ivanovo Oblast Location within Russia
- Coordinates: 56°55′N 40°54′E
- Country: Russia
- Region: Ivanovo Oblast
- District: Ivanovsky District
- Time zone: UTC+3:00

Degtyarevo (Russian: Дегтярево) is a rural locality (a village) in Ivanovsky District, Ivanovo Oblast, Russia. Population: 244 (2010 census);

== Geography ==
This rural locality is located 9 km from Ivanovo (the district's administrative centre and capital of Ivanovo Oblast) and 238 km from Moscow. Kruglovo is the nearest rural locality.
