= Prislonikha =

Prislonikha Прислониха
- Village
- Location within Ivanovo Oblast Location within Russia
- Coordinates: 56°57′N 41°09′E
- Country: Russia
- Region: Ivanovo Oblast
- District: Ivanovsky District
- Time zone: UTC+3:00

Prislonikha (Russian: Прислониха) is a rural locality (a village) in Ivanovsky District, Ivanovo Oblast, Russia. Population: 20 (2010 census);

== Geography ==
This rural locality is located 12 kilometres (7.5 mi) from Ivanovo (the district's administrative centre and capital of Ivanovo Oblast) and 253 kilometres (157 mi) from Moscow. Ormovo Bolshoye is the nearest rural locality.
