= Vysokovo, Ivanovo Oblast =

Vysokovo Высоково
- Village
- Location within Ivanovo Oblast Location within Russia
- Coordinates: 57°10′N 40°56′E
- Country: Russia
- Region: Ivanovo Oblast
- District: Ivanovsky District
- Time zone: UTC+3:00

Vysokovo (Russian: Высоково) is a rural locality (a village) in Ivanovsky District, Ivanovo Oblast, Russia. Population: 110 (2010 census);

== Geography ==
This rural locality is located 20 km from Ivanovo (the district's administrative centre and capital of Ivanovo Oblast) and 255 km from Moscow. Maksaki is the nearest rural locality.
