= Pesochnevo =

Pesochnevo Песочнево
- Village
- Location within Ivanovo Oblast Location within Russia
- Coordinates: 57°02′N 40°50′E
- Country: Russia
- Region: Ivanovo Oblast
- District: Ivanovsky District
- Time zone: UTC+3:00

Pesochnevo (Russian: Песочнево) is a rural locality (a village) in Ivanovsky District, Ivanovo Oblast, Russia. Population: 258 (2010 census); 193 (2002 census);

== Geography ==
This rural locality is located 10 km from Ivanovo (the district's administrative centre and capital of Ivanovo Oblast) and 242 km from Moscow. Miltsevo is the nearest rural locality.
