= Kolbatskoye =

Kolbatskoye Колбацкое
- Selo
- Location within Ivanovo Oblast Location within Russia
- Coordinates: 57°02′N 41°24′E
- Country: Russia
- Region: Ivanovo Oblast
- District: Ivanovsky District
- Time zone: UTC+3:00

Kolbatskoye (Russian: Колбацкое) is a rural locality (a selo) in Ivanovsky District, Ivanovo Oblast, Russia. Population: 136 (2010 census);

== Geography ==
This rural locality is located 27 km from Ivanovo (the district's administrative centre and capital of Ivanovo Oblast) and 270 km from Moscow. Bedryayevo is the nearest rural locality.
