= Shulgino, Ivanovsky District, Ivanovo Oblast =

Shulgino Шульгино
- Village
- Location within Ivanovo Oblast Location within Russia
- Coordinates: 56°51′N 41°05′E
- Country: Russia
- Region: Ivanovo Oblast
- District: Ivanovsky District
- Time zone: UTC+3:00

Shulgino (Russian: Шульгино) is a rural locality (a village) in Ivanovsky District, Ivanovo Oblast, Russia. Population: 6 (2010 census);

== Geography ==
This rural locality is located 17 kilometres (11 mi) from Ivanovo (the district's administrative centre and capital of Ivanovo Oblast) and 244 kilometres (152 mi) from Moscow. Mikhalitsy is the nearest rural locality.
