= Rodiontsovo =

Rodiontsovo Родионцово
- Selo
- Location within Ivanovo Oblast Location within Russia
- Coordinates: 56°55′N 41°13′E
- Country: Russia
- Region: Ivanovo Oblast
- District: Ivanovsky District
- Time zone: UTC+3:00

Rodiontsovo (Russian: Родионцово) is a rural locality (a selo) in Ivanovsky District, Ivanovo Oblast, Russia. Population: 14 (2010 census);

== Geography ==
This rural locality is located 17 kilometres (11 mi) from Ivanovo (the district's administrative centre and capital of Ivanovo Oblast) and 255 kilometres (158 mi) from Moscow. Zhirokhovo is the nearest rural locality.
