= Sidorovskoye, Ivanovo Oblast =

Sidorovskoye Сидоровское
- Selo
- Location within Ivanovo Oblast Location within Russia
- Coordinates: 57°01′N 41°16′E
- Country: Russia
- Region: Ivanovo Oblast
- District: Ivanovsky District
- Time zone: UTC+3:00

Sidorovskoye (Russian: Сидоровское) is a rural locality (a selo) in Ivanovsky District, Ivanovo Oblast, Russia. Population: 11 (2010 census);

== Geography ==
This rural locality is located 19 kilometres (12 mi) from Ivanovo (the district's administrative centre and capital of Ivanovo Oblast) and 263 kilometres (163 mi) from Moscow. Kalikino is the nearest rural locality.
