= Pankratsevo =

Pankratsevo Панкратцево
- Village
- Location within Ivanovo Oblast Location within Russia
- Coordinates: 56°58′N 41°13′E
- Country: Russia
- Region: Ivanovo Oblast
- District: Ivanovsky District
- Time zone: UTC+3:00

Pankratsevo (Russian: Панкратцево) is a rural locality (a village) in Ivanovsky District, Ivanovo Oblast, Russia. Population: 5 (2010 census);

== Geography ==
This rural locality is located 15 km from Ivanovo (the district's administrative centre and capital of Ivanovo Oblast) and 257 km from Moscow. Safrontsevo is the nearest rural locality.
