= Bunkovo, Ivanovo Oblast =

Bunkovo Буньково
- Selo
- Location within Ivanovo Oblast Location within Russia
- Coordinates: 57°03′N 40°42′E
- Country: Russia
- Region: Ivanovo Oblast
- District: Ivanovsky District
- Time zone: UTC+3:00

Bunkovo (Russian: Буньково) is a rural locality (a selo) in Ivanovsky District, Ivanovo Oblast, Russia. Population: 489 (2010 census);

== Geography ==
This rural locality is located 18 km from Ivanovo (the district's administrative centre and capital of Ivanovo Oblast) and 237 km from Moscow. Myazovo is the nearest rural locality.
