= Praslovo =

Praslovo Праслово
- Village
- Location within Ivanovo Oblast Location within Russia
- Coordinates: 56°50′N 41°04′E
- Country: Russia
- Region: Ivanovo Oblast
- District: Ivanovsky District
- Time zone: UTC+3:00

Praslovo (Russian: Праслово) is a rural locality (a village) in Ivanovsky District, Ivanovo Oblast, Russia. Population: 9 (2010 census);

== Geography ==
This rural locality is located 17 kilometres (11 mi) from Ivanovo (the district's administrative centre and capital of Ivanovo Oblast) and 242 kilometres (150 mi) from Moscow. Palmitsyno is the nearest rural locality.
