= Palmitsyno =

Palmitsyno Пальмицыно
- Village
- Location within Ivanovo Oblast Location within Russia
- Coordinates: 56°51′N 41°03′E
- Country: Russia
- Region: Ivanovo Oblast
- District: Ivanovsky District
- Time zone: UTC+3:00

Palmitsyno (Russian: Пальмицыно) is a rural locality (a village) in Ivanovsky District, Ivanovo Oblast, Russia. Population: 24 (2010 census); 10 (2002 census);

== Geography ==
This rural locality is located 16 km from Ivanovo (the district's administrative centre and capital of Ivanovo Oblast) and 242 km from Moscow. Stromikhino is the nearest rural locality.
