= Tikhon-Volya =

Tikhon-Volya Тихон-Воля
- Village
- Location within Ivanovo Oblast Location within Russia
- Coordinates: 57°18′N 43°01′E
- Country: Russia
- Region: Ivanovo Oblast
- District: Yuryevetsky District
- Time zone: UTC+3:00

Tikhon-Volya (Russian: Тихон-Воля) is a rural locality (a selo) in Yuryevetsky District, Ivanovo Oblast, Russia. Population: 157 (2010 census);

== Geography ==
This rural locality is located 6 kilometres (3.7 mi) from Yuryevets (the district's administrative centre), 128 kilometres (80 mi) from Ivanovo (capital of Ivanovo Oblast) and 367 kilometres (228 mi) from Moscow. Nesterikha is the nearest rural locality.
