= Lazunikha =

Lazunikha Лазуниха
- Village
- Location within Ivanovo Oblast Location within Russia
- Coordinates: 57°08′N 42°06′E
- Country: Russia
- Region: Ivanovo Oblast
- District: Vichugsky District
- Time zone: UTC+3:00

Lazunikha (Russian: Лазуниха) is a rural locality (a village) in Vichugsky District, Ivanovo Oblast, Russia. Population: 12 (2010 census); 33 (2002 census);

== Geography ==
This rural locality is located 14 km from Vichuga (the district's administrative centre), 71 km from Ivanovo (capital of Ivanovo Oblast) and 312 km from Moscow. Bulatikha is the nearest rural locality.
