= Platkovo =

Platkovo Платково
- Village
- Location within Ivanovo Oblast Location within Russia
- Coordinates: 57°29′N 42°09′E
- Country: Russia
- Region: Ivanovo Oblast
- District: Zavolzhsky District
- Time zone: UTC+3:00

Platkovo (Russian: Платково) is a rural locality (a village) in Zavolzhsky District, Ivanovo Oblast, Russia. Population: 49 (2010 census);

== Geography ==
This rural locality is located 1 km from Zavolzhsk (the district's administrative centre), 91 km from Ivanovo (capital of Ivanovo Oblast) and 333 km from Moscow. Zavolzhsk is the nearest rural locality.
