= Krapivnovo, Shuysky District =

Krapivnovo Крапивново
- Village
- Location within Ivanovo Oblast Location within Russia
- Coordinates: 56°42′N 41°35′E
- Country: Russia
- Region: Ivanovo Oblast
- District: Shuysky District
- Time zone: UTC+3:00

Krapivnovo (Russian: Крапивново) is a rural locality (a village) in Shuysky District, Ivanovo Oblast, Russia. Population: 8 (2010 census);

== Geography ==
This rural locality is located 20 kilometres (12 mi) from Shuya (the district's administrative centre), 50 kilometres (31 mi) from Ivanovo (capital of Ivanovo Oblast) and 265 kilometres (165 mi) from Moscow. Chashchevo is the nearest rural locality.
