= Timoshkino, Ivanovo Oblast =

Timoshkino Тимошкино
- Village
- Location within Ivanovo Oblast Location within Russia
- Coordinates: 56°54′N 41°04′E
- Country: Russia
- Region: Ivanovo Oblast
- District: Ivanovsky District
- Time zone: UTC+3:00

Timoshkino (Russian: Тимошкино) is a rural locality (a village) in Ivanovsky District, Ivanovo Oblast, Russia. Population: 80 (2010 census);

== Geography ==
This rural locality is located 12 kilometres (7.5 mi) from Ivanovo (the district's administrative centre and capital of Ivanovo Oblast) and 246 kilometres (153 mi) from Moscow. Nezhilovo is the nearest rural locality.
