= Peshkovo, Kineshemsky District, Ivanovo Oblast =

Peshkovo Пешково
- Village
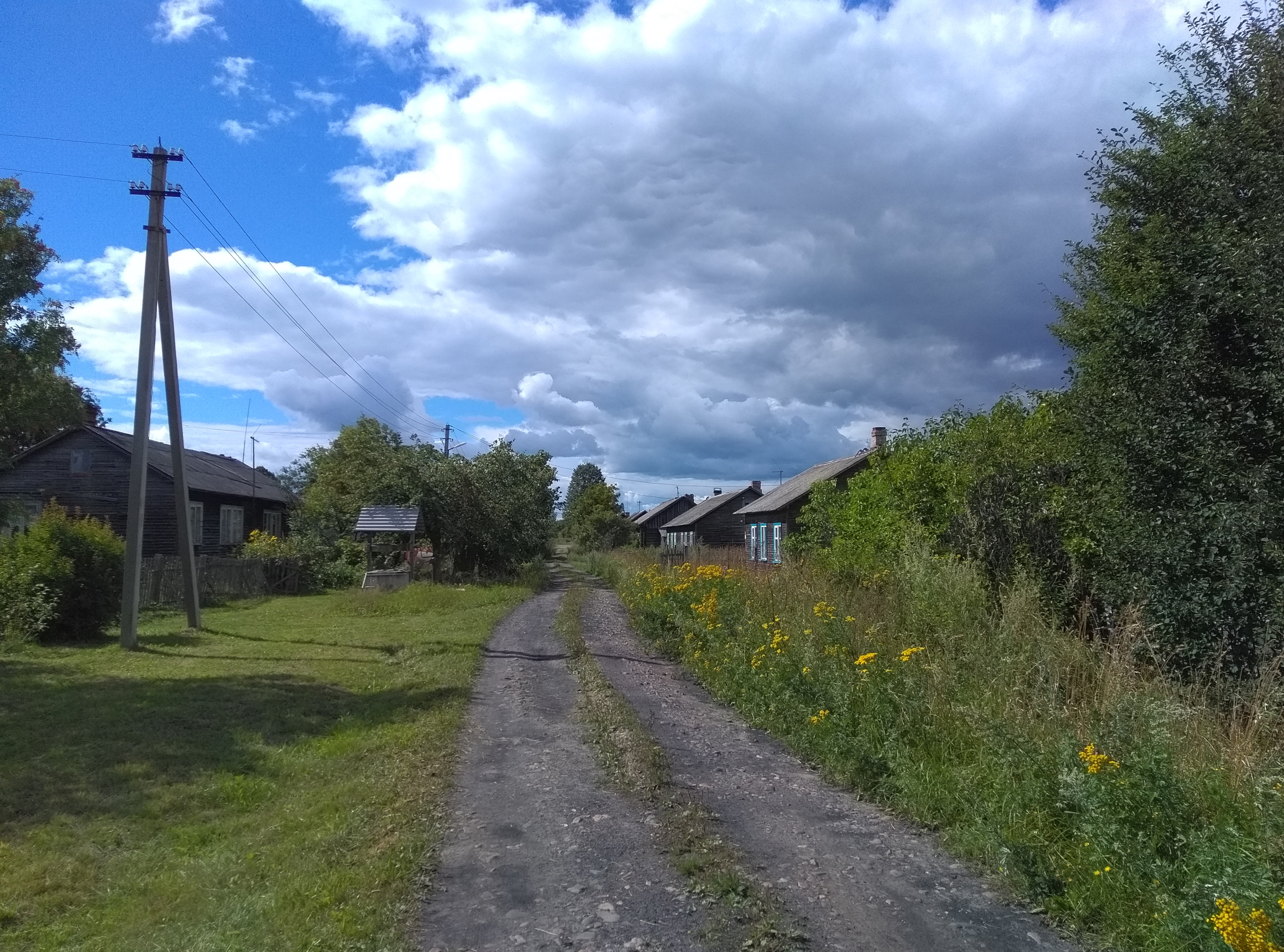

- Location within Ivanovo Oblast Location within Russia
- Coordinates: 57°19′N 42°04′E
- Country: Russia
- Region: Ivanovo Oblast
- District: Kineshemsky District

Population (2010)
  - Total: 51
- Time zone: UTC+3:00

Peshkovo (Russian: Пешково) is a rural locality (a village) in Kineshemsky District, Ivanovo Oblast, Russia.

== Geography ==
This rural locality is located 15 kilometres (9.3 mi) from Kineshma (the district's administrative centre), 76 kilometres (47 mi) from Ivanovo (capital of Ivanovo Oblast) and 319 kilometres (198 mi) from Moscow. Chernyshevo is the nearest rural locality.
