= Khrebtovo, Ivanovo Oblast =

Khrebtovo Хребтово
- Village
- Location within Ivanovo Oblast Location within Russia
- Coordinates: 57°05′N 40°52′E
- Country: Russia
- Region: Ivanovo Oblast
- District: Ivanovsky District
- Time zone: UTC+3:00

Khrebtovo (Russian: Хребтово) is a rural locality (a village) in Ivanovsky District, Ivanovo Oblast, Russia. Population:32 (2021 census); 50 (2010 census);

== Geography ==
This rural locality is located 13 kilometres (8.1 mi) from Ivanovo (the district's administrative centre and capital of Ivanovo Oblast) and 247 kilometres (153 mi) from Moscow. Ivantsevo is the nearest rural locality.
