= Kottsyno =

Kottsyno Котцыно
- Selo
- Location within Ivanovo Oblast Location within Russia
- Coordinates: 57°02′N 41°12′E
- Country: Russia
- Region: Ivanovo Oblast
- District: Ivanovsky District
- Time zone: UTC+3:00

Kottsyno (Russian: Котцыно) is a rural locality (a selo) in Ivanovsky District, Ivanovo Oblast, Russia. Population: 180 (2010 census);

== Geography ==
This rural locality is located 16 km from Ivanovo (the district's administrative centre and capital of Ivanovo Oblast) and 260 km from Moscow. Stanovoye is the nearest rural locality.
