= Osanovets =

Osanovets Осановец
- Selo
- Location within Ivanovo Oblast Location within Russia
- Coordinates: 56°33′N 39°59′E
- Country: Russia
- Region: Ivanovo Oblast
- District: Gavrilovo-Posadsky District
- Time zone: UTC+3:00

Osanovets (Russian: Осановец) is a rural locality (a selo) in Gavrilovo-Posadsky District, Ivanovo Oblast, Russia. Population: 564 (2010 census);

== Geography ==
This rural locality is located 8 km from Gavrilov Posad (the district's administrative centre), 77 km from Ivanovo (capital of Ivanovo Oblast) and 171 km from Moscow. Shelbovo is the nearest rural locality.
