= Chernorechensky, Ivanovo Oblast =

Chernorechensky Чернореченский
- Village
- Location within Ivanovo Oblast Location within Russia
- Coordinates: 56°58′N 40°51′E
- Country: Russia
- Region: Ivanovo Oblast
- District: Ivanovsky District
- Time zone: UTC+3:00

Chernorechensky (Russian: Чернореченский) is a rural locality (a village) in Ivanovsky District, Ivanovo Oblast, Russia. Population: 1,669 (2010 census); 1,625 (2002 census);

== Geography ==
This rural locality is located 7 kilometres (4.3 mi) from Ivanovo (the district's administrative centre and capital of Ivanovo Oblast) and 239 kilometres (149 mi) from Moscow. Kadnikovo is the nearest rural locality.
