= Malinki, Ivanovo Oblast =

Malinki Малинки
- Village
- Location within Ivanovo Oblast Location within Russia
- Coordinates: 56°59′N 41°09′E
- Country: Russia
- Region: Ivanovo Oblast
- District: Ivanovsky District
- Time zone: UTC+3:00

Malinki (Russian: Малинки) is a rural locality (a village) in Ivanovsky District, Ivanovo Oblast, Russia. Population: 25 (2010 census);

== Geography ==
This rural locality is located 11 km from Ivanovo (the district's administrative centre and capital of Ivanovo Oblast) and 255 km from Moscow. Yelyunino is the nearest rural locality.
