= Bibirevo, Ivanovo Oblast =

Bibirevo Бибирево
- Selo
- Location within Ivanovo Oblast Location within Russia
- Coordinates: 57°08′N 41°02′E
- Country: Russia
- Region: Ivanovo Oblast
- District: Ivanovsky District
- Time zone: UTC+3:00

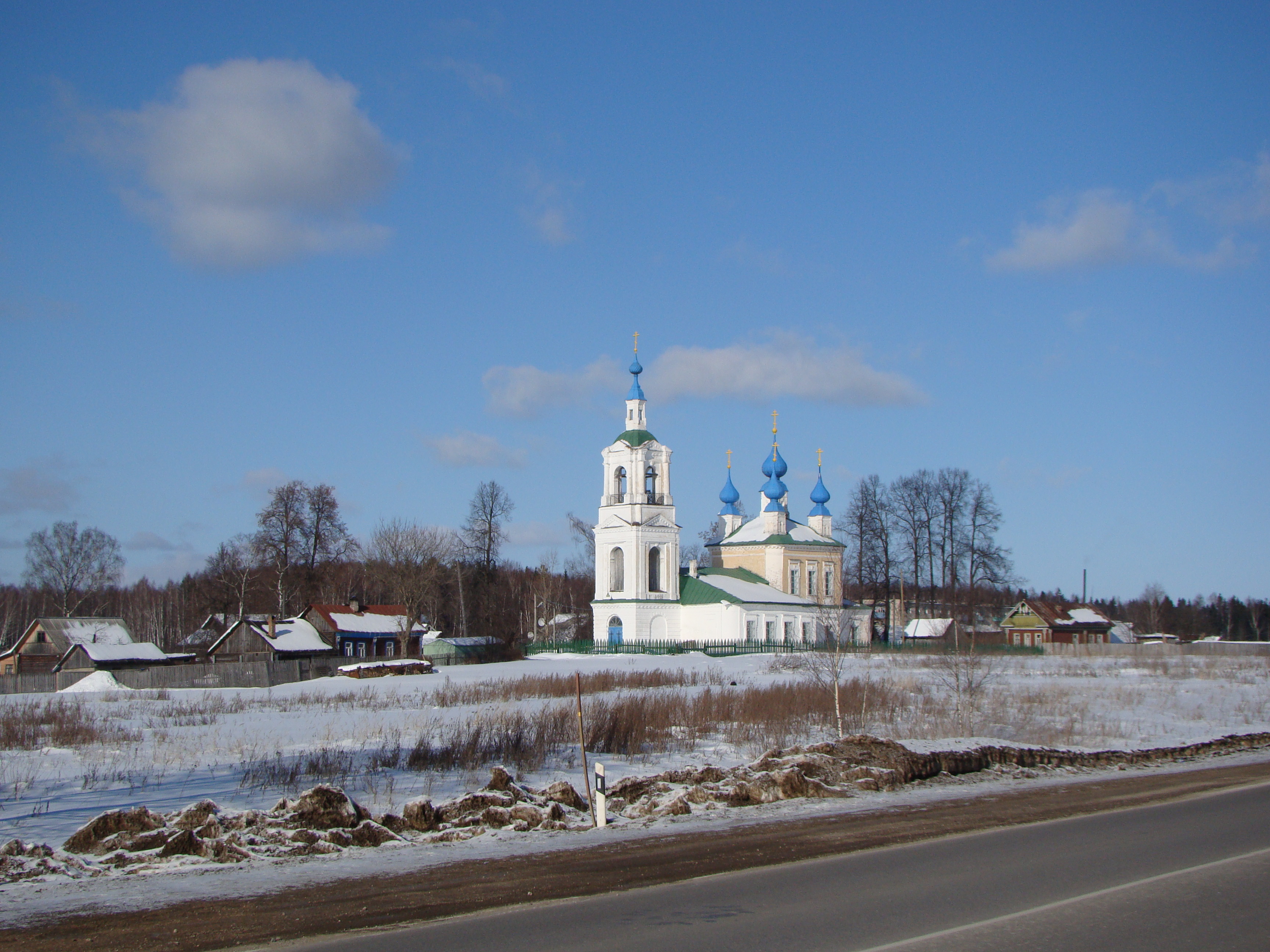
Elijah church Bibirevo Ivanovo

Bibirevo (Russian: Бибирево) is a rural locality (a selo) in Ivanovsky District, Ivanovo Oblast, Russia. Population: 236 (2010 census); 312 (2002 census);

== Geography ==
This rural locality is located 17 km from Ivanovo (the district's administrative centre and capital of Ivanovo Oblast) and 258 km from Moscow. Golchanovo is the nearest rural locality.
