= Tyugayevo =

Tyugayevo Тюгаево
- Village
- Location within Ivanovo Oblast Location within Russia
- Coordinates: 57°13′N 40°13′E
- Country: Russia
- Region: Ivanovo Oblast
- District: Komsomolsky District
- Time zone: UTC+3:00

Tyugayevo (Russian: Тюгаево) is a rural locality (a selo) in Komsomolsky District, Ivanovo Oblast, Russia. Population: 36 (2010 census);

== Geography ==
This rural locality is located 25 kilometres (16 mi) from Komsomolsk (the district's administrative centre), 52 kilometres (32 mi) from Ivanovo (capital of Ivanovo Oblast) and 227 kilometres (141 mi) from Moscow. Golokhovo is the nearest rural locality.
