= Mugreyevo-Dmitriyevskoye =

Mugreyevo-Dmitriyevskoye Мугреево-Дмитриевское
- Village
- Location within Ivanovo Oblast Location within Russia
- Coordinates: 56°39′N 42°12′E
- Country: Russia
- Region: Ivanovo Oblast
- District: Yuzhsky District
- Time zone: UTC+3:00

Mugreyevo-Dmitriyevskoye (Russian: Мугреево-Дмитриевское) is a rural locality (a selo) in Yuzhsky District, Ivanovo Oblast, Russia. Population: 38 (2010 census);

== Geography ==
This rural locality is located 15 kilometres (9.3 mi) from Yuzha (the district's administrative centre), 85 kilometres (53 mi) from Ivanovo (capital of Ivanovo Oblast) and 298 kilometres (185 mi) from Moscow. Mugreyevo-Nikolskoye is the nearest rural locality.
