= Yuryevskoye =

Yuryevskoye Юрьевское
- Village
- Location within Ivanovo Oblast Location within Russia
- Coordinates: 57°04′N 41°10′E
- Country: Russia
- Region: Ivanovo Oblast
- District: Ivanovsky District
- Time zone: UTC+3:00

Yuryevskoye (Russian: Юрьевское) is a rural locality (a village) in Ivanovsky District, Ivanovo Oblast, Russia. Population: 75 (2010 census);

== Geography ==
This rural locality is located 15 kilometres (9.3 mi) from Ivanovo (the district's administrative centre and capital of Ivanovo Oblast) and 260 kilometres (160 mi) from Moscow. Krasnoye is the nearest rural locality.
