= Dubynino =

Dubynino Дубынино
- Village
- Location within Ivanovo Oblast Location within Russia
- Coordinates: 56°54′N 41°08′E
- Country: Russia
- Region: Ivanovo Oblast
- District: Ivanovsky District
- Time zone: UTC+3:00

Dubynino (Russian: Дубынино) is a rural locality (a village) in Ivanovsky District, Ivanovo Oblast, Russia. Population: 44 (2010 census); 42 (2002 census);

== Geography ==
This rural locality is located 14 km from Ivanovo (the district's administrative centre and capital of Ivanovo Oblast) and 250 km from Moscow. Gogolevo is the nearest rural locality.
