= Ryabinkino =

Ryabinkino Рябинкино
- Village
- Location within Ivanovo Oblast Location within Russia
- Coordinates: 57°03′N 41°25′E
- Country: Russia
- Region: Ivanovo Oblast
- District: Ivanovsky District
- Time zone: UTC+3:00

Ryabinkino (Russian: Рябинкино) is a rural locality (a village) in Ivanovsky District, Ivanovo Oblast, Russia. Population: 22 (2010 census); 43 (2002 census);

== Geography ==
This rural locality is located 29 kilometres (18 mi) from Ivanovo (the district's administrative centre and capital of Ivanovo Oblast) and 272 kilometres (169 mi) from Moscow. Burakovo is the nearest rural locality.
