= Fedyayevo, Ivanovo Oblast =

Fedyayevo Федяево
- Village
- Location within Ivanovo Oblast Location within Russia
- Coordinates: 57°12′N 42°00′E
- Country: Russia
- Region: Ivanovo Oblast
- District: Vichugsky District
- Time zone: UTC+3:00

Fedyayevo (Russian: Федяево) is a rural locality (a village) in Vichugsky District, Ivanovo Oblast, Russia. Population: 33 (2010 census); 44 (2002 census);

== Geography ==
This rural locality is located 5 km from Vichuga (the district's administrative centre), 67 km from Ivanovo (capital of Ivanovo Oblast) and 309 km from Moscow. Vyalikha is the nearest rural locality.
