= Shurintsevo =

Shurintsevo Шуринцево
- Village
- Location within Ivanovo Oblast Location within Russia
- Coordinates: 57°03′N 40°53′E
- Country: Russia
- Region: Ivanovo Oblast
- District: Ivanovsky District
- Time zone: UTC+3:00

Shurintsevo (Russian: Шуринцево) is a rural locality (a village) in Ivanovsky District, Ivanovo Oblast, Russia. Population: 159 (2010 census); 30 (2002 census);

== Geography ==
This rural locality is located 8 kilometres (5.0 mi) from Ivanovo (the district's administrative centre and capital of Ivanovo Oblast) and 245 kilometres (152 mi) from Moscow. Uvod is the nearest rural locality.
