= Nikulskoye, Ivanovsky District, Ivanovo Oblast =

Nikulskoye Никульское
- Village
- Location within Ivanovo Oblast Location within Russia
- Coordinates: 56°54′N 40°57′E
- Country: Russia
- Region: Ivanovo Oblast
- District: Ivanovsky District
- Time zone: UTC+3:00

Nikulskoye (Russian: Никульское) is a rural locality (a village) in Ivanovsky District, Ivanovo Oblast, Russia. Population: 82 (2010 census);

== Geography ==
This rural locality is located 9 km from Ivanovo (the district's administrative centre and capital of Ivanovo Oblast) and 240 km from Moscow. Vostra is the nearest rural locality.
