= Smenovo =

Smenovo Сменово
- Village
- Location within Ivanovo Oblast Location within Russia
- Coordinates: 56°54′N 40°53′E
- Country: Russia
- Region: Ivanovo Oblast
- District: Ivanovsky District
- Time zone: UTC+3:00

Smenovo (Russian: Сменово) is a rural locality (a village) in Ivanovsky District, Ivanovo Oblast, Russia. Population: 10 (2010 census);

== Geography ==
This rural locality is located 11 kilometres (6.8 mi) from Ivanovo (the district's administrative centre and capital of Ivanovo Oblast) and 236 kilometres (147 mi) from Moscow. Lupanovo is the nearest rural locality.
