= Zalesye, Ivanovsky District, Ivanovo Oblast =

Zalesye Залесье
- Village
- Location within Ivanovo Oblast Location within Russia
- Coordinates: 57°01′N 40°45′E
- Country: Russia
- Region: Ivanovo Oblast
- District: Ivanovsky District
- Time zone: UTC+3:00

Zalesye (Russian: Залесье) is a rural locality (a village) in Ivanovsky District, Ivanovo Oblast, Russia. Population: 284 (2010 census);

== Geography ==
This rural locality is located 13 km from Ivanovo (the district's administrative centre and capital of Ivanovo Oblast) and 237 km from Moscow. Kuligi is the nearest rural locality.
