= Yamskaya, Ivanovo Oblast =

Yamskaya Ямская
- Village
- Location within Ivanovo Oblast Location within Russia
- Coordinates: 57°17′N 43°05′E
- Country: Russia
- Region: Ivanovo Oblast
- District: Yuryevetsky District
- Time zone: UTC+3:00

Yamskaya (Russian: Ямская) is a rural locality (a village) in Yuryevetsky District, Ivanovo Oblast, Russia. Population: 206 (2010 census);
