= Deryabikha, Ivanovo Oblast =

Deryabikha Дерябиха
- Village
- Location within Ivanovo Oblast Location within Russia
- Coordinates: 56°56′N 41°03′E
- Country: Russia
- Region: Ivanovo Oblast
- District: Ivanovsky District
- Time zone: UTC+3:00

Deryabikha (Russian: Дерябиха) is a rural locality (a village) in Ivanovsky District, Ivanovo Oblast, Russia. Population: 105 (2010 census); 82 (2002 census);

== Geography ==
This rural locality is located 8 km from Ivanovo (the district's administrative centre and capital of Ivanovo Oblast) and 248 km from Moscow. Kochedykovo is the nearest rural locality.
