= Lysnovo =

Lysnovo Лысново
- Village
- Location within Ivanovo Oblast Location within Russia
- Coordinates: 56°53′N 40°55′E
- Country: Russia
- Region: Ivanovo Oblast
- District: Ivanovsky District
- Time zone: UTC+3:00

Lysnovo (Russian: Лысново) is a rural locality (a village) in Ivanovsky District, Ivanovo Oblast, Russia. Population: 163 (2010 census);

== Geography ==
This rural locality is located 12 km from Ivanovo (the district's administrative centre and capital of Ivanovo Oblast) and 237 km from Moscow. Paneyevo is the nearest rural locality.
