= Krivtsovo, Ivanovo Oblast =

Krivtsovo Кривцово
- Village
- Location within Ivanovo Oblast Location within Russia
- Coordinates: 57°02′N 40°51′E
- Country: Russia
- Region: Ivanovo Oblast
- District: Ivanovsky District
- Time zone: UTC+3:00

Krivtsovo (Russian: Кривцово) is a rural locality (a village) in Ivanovsky District, Ivanovo Oblast, Russia. Population: 145 (2010 census); 45 (2002 census);

== Geography ==
This rural locality is located 8 km from Ivanovo (the district's administrative centre and capital of Ivanovo Oblast) and 244 km from Moscow. Dyakovo is the nearest rural locality.
