= Krasny Ostrov, Ivanovo Oblast =

Krasny Ostrov Красный Остров
- Village
- Location within Ivanovo Oblast Location within Russia
- Coordinates: 56°50′N 40°41′E
- Country: Russia
- Region: Ivanovo Oblast
- District: Lezhnevsky District
- Time zone: UTC+3:00

Krasny Ostrov (Russian: Красный Остров) is a rural locality (a village) in Lezhnevsky District, Ivanovo Oblast, Russia. Population: 11 (2010 census);

== Geography ==
This rural locality is located 15 kilometres (9.3 mi) from Lezhnevo (the district's administrative centre), 23 kilometres (14 mi) from Ivanovo (capital of Ivanovo Oblast) and 223 kilometres (139 mi) from Moscow. Aladino is the nearest rural locality.
