= Yarlykovo, Ivanovsky District, Ivanovo Oblast =

Yarlykovo Ярлыково
- Village
- Location within Ivanovo Oblast Location within Russia
- Coordinates: 57°03′N 41°20′E
- Country: Russia
- Region: Ivanovo Oblast
- District: Ivanovsky District
- Time zone: UTC+3:00

Yarlykovo (Russian: Ярлыково) is a rural locality (a village) in Ivanovsky District, Ivanovo Oblast, Russia. Population: 46 (2010 census);

== Geography ==
This rural locality is located 24 km from Ivanovo (the district's administrative centre and capital of Ivanovo Oblast) and 269 km from Moscow. Dylevo is the nearest rural locality.
