= Volzhanka, Ivanovo Oblast =

Volzhanka Волжанка
- Village
- Location within Ivanovo Oblast Location within Russia
- Coordinates: 56°55′N 41°09′E
- Country: Russia
- Region: Ivanovo Oblast
- District: Ivanovsky District
- Time zone: UTC+3:00

Volzhanka (Russian: Волжанка) is a rural locality (a village) in Ivanovsky District, Ivanovo Oblast, Russia. Population: 38 (2010 census);

== Geography ==
This rural locality is located 14 km from Ivanovo (the district's administrative centre and capital of Ivanovo Oblast) and 251 km from Moscow. Gogolevo is the nearest rural locality.
