= Oshurikha =

Oshurikha Ошуриха
- Village
- Location within Ivanovo Oblast Location within Russia
- Coordinates: 57°03′N 41°18′E
- Country: Russia
- Region: Ivanovo Oblast
- District: Ivanovsky District
- Time zone: UTC+3:00

Oshurikha (Russian: Ошуриха) is a rural locality (a village) in Ivanovsky District, Ivanovo Oblast, Russia. Population: 12 (2010 census); 13 (2002 census);

== Geography ==
This rural locality is located 22 km from Ivanovo (the district's administrative centre and capital of Ivanovo Oblast) and 266 km from Moscow. Petrovskoye is the nearest rural locality.
