= Novoye Goryanovo =

Novoye Goryanovo Новое Горяново
- Village
- Location within Ivanovo Oblast Location within Russia
- Coordinates: 56°53′N 40°22′E
- Country: Russia
- Region: Ivanovo Oblast
- District: Teykovsky District
- Time zone: UTC+3:00

Novoye Goryanovo (Russian: Новое Горяново) is a rural locality (a selo) in Teykovsky District, Ivanovo Oblast, Russia. Population: 1,100 (2010 census);
