= Uvod, Ivanovo Oblast =

Uvod Уводь
- Village
- Location within Ivanovo Oblast Location within Russia
- Coordinates: 57°03′N 40°52′E
- Country: Russia
- Region: Ivanovo Oblast
- District: Ivanovsky District
- Time zone: UTC+3:00

Uvod (Russian: Уводь) is a rural locality (a village) in Ivanovsky District, Ivanovo Oblast, Russia. Population: 175 (2010 census);

== Geography ==
This rural locality is located 9 kilometres (5.6 mi) from Ivanovo (the district's administrative centre and capital of Ivanovo Oblast) and 245 kilometres (152 mi) from Moscow. Shurintsevo is the nearest rural locality.
