= Myt =

Myt Мыт
- Selo
- Location within Ivanovo Oblast Location within Russia
- Coordinates: 56°49′N 42°18′E
- Country: Russia
- Region: Ivanovo Oblast
- District: Verkhnelandekhovsky District
- Time zone: UTC+3:00

Myt (Russian: Мыт) is a rural locality (a selo) in Verkhnelandekhovsky District, Ivanovo Oblast, Russia. Population: 1,121 (2010 census);

== Geography ==
This rural locality is located 17 km from Verkhny Landekh (the district's administrative centre), 84 km from Ivanovo (capital of Ivanovo Oblast) and 309 km from Moscow. Isakovo is the nearest rural locality.
