= Prigorodnoye, Ivanovo Oblast =

Prigorodnoye Пригородное
- Village
- Location within Ivanovo Oblast Location within Russia
- Coordinates: 57°06′N 41°45′E
- Country: Russia
- Region: Ivanovo Oblast
- District: Rodnikovsky District
- Time zone: UTC+3:00

Prigorodnoye (Russian: Пригородное) is a rural locality (a selo) in Rodnikovsky District, Ivanovo Oblast, Russia. Population: 418 (2010 census);
