= Kupalishchi =

Kupalishchi Купалищи
- Village
- Location within Ivanovo Oblast Location within Russia
- Coordinates: 56°53′N 40°57′E
- Country: Russia
- Region: Ivanovo Oblast
- District: Ivanovsky District
- Time zone: UTC+3:00

Kupalishchi (Russian: Купалищи) is a rural locality (a village) in Ivanovsky District, Ivanovo Oblast, Russia. It has a population of 28 (2010 census);

== Geography ==
This rural locality is approximately located 11 kilometres (6.8 mi) from Ivanovo (the district's administrative centre and capital of Ivanovo Oblast) and 239 kilometres (149 mi) from Moscow. Lomy is the nearest rural locality.
