= Golchanovo =

Golchanovo Голчаново
- Village
- Location within Ivanovo Oblast Location within Russia
- Coordinates: 57°00′N 40°49′E
- Country: Russia
- Region: Ivanovo Oblast
- District: Ivanovsky District
- Time zone: UTC+3:00

Golchanovo (Russian: Голчаново) is a rural locality (a village) in Ivanovsky District, Ivanovo Oblast, Russia. Population: 124 (2010 census);

== Geography ==
This rural locality is located 9 km from Ivanovo (the district's administrative centre and capital of Ivanovo Oblast) and 239 km from Moscow. Kadnikovo is the nearest rural locality.
