= Seminovo =

Seminovo Семиново
- Village
- Location within Ivanovo Oblast Location within Russia
- Coordinates: 57°00′N 41°14′E
- Country: Russia
- Region: Ivanovo Oblast
- District: Ivanovsky District
- Time zone: UTC+3:00

Seminovo (Russian: Семиново) is a rural locality (a village) in Ivanovsky District, Ivanovo Oblast, Russia. Population: 36 (2010 census);

== Geography ==
This rural locality is located 17 kilometres (11 mi) from Ivanovo (the district's administrative centre and capital of Ivanovo Oblast) and 260 kilometres (160 mi) from Moscow. Panferyevo is the nearest rural locality.
