= Afanasovo, Ivanovsky District, Ivanovo Oblast =

Afanasovo Афанасово
- Village
- Location within Ivanovo Oblast Location within Russia
- Coordinates: 57°00′N 41°02′E
- Country: Russia
- Region: Ivanovo Oblast
- District: Ivanovsky District
- Time zone: UTC+3:00

Afanasovo (Russian: Афанасово) is a rural locality (a village) in Ivanovsky District, Ivanovo Oblast, Russia. Population: 865 (2010 census);

== Geography ==
This rural locality is located 5 km from Ivanovo (the district's administrative centre and capital of Ivanovo Oblast) and 250 km from Moscow. Bogorodskoye is the nearest rural locality.
