= Kryukovo, Ivanovo Oblast =

Kryukovo Крюково
- Village
- Location within Ivanovo Oblast Location within Russia
- Coordinates: 57°05′N 40°52′E
- Country: Russia
- Region: Ivanovo Oblast
- District: Ivanovsky District
- Time zone: UTC+3:00

Kryukovo (Russian: Крюково) is a rural locality (a village) in Ivanovsky District, Ivanovo Oblast, Russia. Population: 33 (2010 census); 34 (2002 census);

== Geography ==
This rural locality is located 12 km from Ivanovo (the district's administrative centre and capital of Ivanovo Oblast) and 246 km from Moscow. Yegory is the nearest rural locality.
