= Khmelniki =

Khmelniki Хмельники
- Village
- Location within Ivanovo Oblast Location within Russia
- Coordinates: 56°56′N 41°47′E
- Country: Russia
- Region: Ivanovo Oblast
- District: Rodnikovsky District
- Time zone: UTC+3:00

Khmelniki (Russian: Хмельники) is a rural locality (a village) in Rodnikovsky District, Ivanovo Oblast, Russia. Population: 104 (2010 census);

== Geography ==
This rural locality is located 18 kilometres (11 mi) from Rodniki (the district's administrative centre), 50 kilometres (31 mi) from Ivanovo (capital of Ivanovo Oblast) and 285 kilometres (177 mi) from Moscow. Sosnovets is the nearest rural locality.
