= Yegory =

Yegory Егорий
- Selo
- Location within Ivanovo Oblast Location within Russia
- Coordinates: 57°05′N 40°51′E
- Country: Russia
- Region: Ivanovo Oblast
- District: Ivanovsky District
- Time zone: UTC+3:00

Yegory (Russian: Егорий) is a rural locality (a selo) in Ivanovsky District, Ivanovo Oblast, Russia. Population: 12 (2010 census);

== Geography ==
This rural locality is located 13 km from Ivanovo (the district's administrative centre and capital of Ivanovo Oblast) and 245 km from Moscow. Kryukovo is the nearest rural locality.
