= Bedryayevo =

Bedryayevo Бедряево
- Village
- Location within Ivanovo Oblast Location within Russia
- Coordinates: 57°02′N 41°23′E
- Country: Russia
- Region: Ivanovo Oblast
- District: Ivanovsky District
- Time zone: UTC+3:00

Bedryayevo (Russian: Бедряево) is a rural locality (a village) in Ivanovsky District, Ivanovo Oblast, Russia. Population: 15 (2010 census);

== Geography ==
This rural locality is located 26 km from Ivanovo (the district's administrative centre and capital of Ivanovo Oblast) and 269 km from Moscow. Kolbatskoye is the nearest rural locality.
