= Nikulino, Pestyakovsky District, Ivanovo Oblast =

Nikulino Никулино
- Village
- Location within Ivanovo Oblast Location within Russia
- Coordinates: 56°35′N 42°44′E
- Country: Russia
- Region: Ivanovo Oblast
- District: Pestyakovsky District
- Time zone: UTC+3:00

Nikulino (Russian: Никулино) is a rural locality (a selo) in Pestyakovsky District, Ivanovo Oblast, Russia. Population: 67 (2010 census);

== Geography ==
This rural locality is located 14 kilometres (8.7 mi) from Pestyaki (the district's administrative centre), 118 kilometres (73 mi) from Ivanovo (capital of Ivanovo Oblast) and 327 kilometres (203 mi) from Moscow. Ivanovo is the nearest rural locality.
