= Sitnikovo, Ivanovsky District, Ivanovo Oblast =

Sitnikovo Ситниково
- Village
- Location within Ivanovo Oblast Location within Russia
- Coordinates: 57°02′N 40°41′E
- Country: Russia
- Region: Ivanovo Oblast
- District: Ivanovsky District
- Time zone: UTC+3:00

Sitnikovo (Russian: Ситниково) is a rural locality (a village) in Ivanovsky District, Ivanovo Oblast, Russia. Population: 10 (2010 census);

== Geography ==
This rural locality is located 18 kilometres (11 mi) from Ivanovo (the district's administrative centre and capital of Ivanovo Oblast) and 234 kilometres (145 mi) from Moscow. Serkovo is the nearest rural locality.
