= Teplovo =

Teplovo Теплово
- Village
- Location within Ivanovo Oblast Location within Russia
- Coordinates: 56°54′N 41°11′E
- Country: Russia
- Region: Ivanovo Oblast
- District: Ivanovsky District
- Time zone: UTC+3:00

Teplovo (Russian: Теплово) is a rural locality (a village) in Ivanovsky District, Ivanovo Oblast, Russia. Population: 10 (2010 census); 17 (2002 census);

== Geography ==
This rural locality is located 17 kilometres (11 mi) from Ivanovo (the district's administrative centre and capital of Ivanovo Oblast) and 252 kilometres (157 mi) from Moscow. Kozhevnitsy is the nearest rural locality.
