= Mikshino, Ivanovo Oblast =

Mikshino Микшино
- Village
- Location within Ivanovo Oblast Location within Russia
- Coordinates: 57°09′N 40°47′E
- Country: Russia
- Region: Ivanovo Oblast
- District: Ivanovsky District
- Time zone: UTC+3:00

Mikshino (Russian: Микшино) is a rural locality (a village) in Ivanovsky District, Ivanovo Oblast, Russia. Population: 13 (2010 census);

== Geography ==
This rural locality is located 21 km from Ivanovo (the district's administrative centre and capital of Ivanovo Oblast) and 247 km from Moscow. Baglayevo is the nearest rural locality.
