= Baglayevo =

Baglayevo Баглаево
- Village
- Location within Ivanovo Oblast Location within Russia
- Coordinates: 57°08′N 40°46′E
- Country: Russia
- Region: Ivanovo Oblast
- District: Ivanovsky District
- Time zone: UTC+3:00

Baglayevo (Russian: Баглаево) is a rural locality (a village) in Ivanovsky District, Ivanovo Oblast, Russia. Population: 11 (2010 census);

== Geography ==
This rural locality is located 21 km from Ivanovo (the district's administrative centre and capital of Ivanovo Oblast) and 245 km from Moscow. Mikshino is the nearest rural locality.
