= Dobrynskoye, Ivanovo Oblast =

Dobrynskoye Добрынское
- Village
- Location within Ivanovo Oblast Location within Russia
- Coordinates: 57°05′N 41°17′E
- Country: Russia
- Region: Ivanovo Oblast
- District: Ivanovsky District
- Time zone: UTC+3:00

Dobrynskoye (Russian: Добрынское) is a rural locality (a village) in Ivanovsky District, Ivanovo Oblast, Russia. Population: 9 (2010 census); 11 (2002 census);

== Geography ==
This rural locality is located 23 km from Ivanovo (the district's administrative centre and capital of Ivanovo Oblast) and 268 km from Moscow. Timoshikha is the nearest rural locality.
