= Tserkovnovo =

Tserkovnovo Церковново
- Selo
- Location within Ivanovo Oblast Location within Russia
- Coordinates: 57°01′N 40°37′E
- Country: Russia
- Region: Ivanovo Oblast
- District: Ivanovsky District
- Time zone: UTC+3:00

Tserkovnovo (Russian: Церковново) is a rural locality (a selo) in Ivanovsky District, Ivanovo Oblast, Russia. Population: 28 (2010 census);

== Geography ==
This rural locality is located 21 kilometres (13 mi) from Ivanovo (the district's administrative centre and capital of Ivanovo Oblast) and 230 kilometres (140 mi) from Moscow. Froltsevo is the nearest rural locality.
