= Stromikhino =

Stromikhino Стромихино
- Selo
- Location within Ivanovo Oblast Location within Russia
- Coordinates: 56°51′N 41°04′E
- Country: Russia
- Region: Ivanovo Oblast
- District: Ivanovsky District
- Time zone: UTC+3:00

Stromikhino (Russian: Стромихино) is a rural locality (a selo) in Ivanovsky District, Ivanovo Oblast, Russia. Population: 121 (2010 census);

== Geography ==
This rural locality is located 15 kilometres (9.3 mi) from Ivanovo (the district's administrative centre and capital of Ivanovo Oblast) and 243 kilometres (151 mi) from Moscow. Palmitsyno is the nearest rural locality.
