= Grigorovo, Ivanovsky District, Ivanovo Oblast =

Grigorovo Григорово
- Village
- Location within Ivanovo Oblast Location within Russia
- Coordinates: 57°05′N 40°43′E
- Country: Russia
- Region: Ivanovo Oblast
- District: Ivanovsky District
- Time zone: UTC+3:00

Grigorovo (Russian: Григорово) is a rural locality (a village) in Ivanovsky District, Ivanovo Oblast, Russia. Population: 15 (2010 census);

== Geography ==
This rural locality is located 18 km from Ivanovo (the district's administrative centre and capital of Ivanovo Oblast) and 239 km from Moscow. Strelkovo Pervoye is the nearest rural locality.
