= Perezhogino =

Perezhogino Пережогино
- Village
- Location within Ivanovo Oblast Location within Russia
- Coordinates: 57°06′N 41°16′E
- Country: Russia
- Region: Ivanovo Oblast
- District: Ivanovsky District
- Time zone: UTC+3:00

Perezhogino (Russian: Пережогино) is a rural locality (a village) in Ivanovsky District, Ivanovo Oblast, Russia. Population: 20 (2010 census); 12 (2002 census);

== Geography ==
This rural locality is located 23 km from Ivanovo (the district's administrative centre and capital of Ivanovo Oblast) and 267 km from Moscow. Shchipachevo is the nearest rural locality.
