= Opolnoye =

Opolnoye Опольное
- Village
- Location within Ivanovo Oblast Location within Russia
- Coordinates: 57°07′N 41°13′E
- Country: Russia
- Region: Ivanovo Oblast
- District: Ivanovsky District
- Time zone: UTC+3:00

Opolnoye (Russian: Опольное) is a rural locality (a village) in Ivanovsky District, Ivanovo Oblast, Russia. Population: 83 (2010 census);

== Geography ==
This rural locality is located 20 km from Ivanovo (the district's administrative centre and capital of Ivanovo Oblast) and 265 km from Moscow. Yermolino is the nearest rural locality.
