= Saltsevo =

Saltsevo Сальцево
- Village
- Location within Ivanovo Oblast Location within Russia
- Coordinates: 56°53′N 41°07′E
- Country: Russia
- Region: Ivanovo Oblast
- District: Ivanovsky District
- Time zone: UTC+3:00

Saltsevo (Russian: Сальцево) is a rural locality (a village) in Ivanovsky District, Ivanovo Oblast, Russia. Population: 25 (2010 census);

== Geography ==
This rural locality is located 14 kilometres (8.7 mi) from Ivanovo (the district's administrative centre and capital of Ivanovo Oblast) and 248 kilometres (154 mi) from Moscow. Manultsevo is the nearest rural locality.
