= Pogorelka, Pestyakovsky District, Ivanovo Oblast =

Pogorelka Погорелка
- Village
- Location within Ivanovo Oblast Location within Russia
- Coordinates: 56°43′N 42°37′E
- Country: Russia
- Region: Ivanovo Oblast
- District: Pestyakovsky District
- Time zone: UTC+3:00

Pogorelka (Russian: Погорелка) is a rural locality (a village) in Pestyakovsky District, Ivanovo Oblast, Russia. Population: 22 (2010 census);

== Geography ==
This rural locality is located 3 kilometres (1.9 mi) from Pestyaki (the district's administrative centre), 106 kilometres (66 mi) from Ivanovo (capital of Ivanovo Oblast) and 324 kilometres (201 mi) from Moscow. Timagino is the nearest rural locality.
