= Blinikha =

Blinikha Блиниха
- Village
- Location within Ivanovo Oblast Location within Russia
- Coordinates: 57°04′N 42°37′E
- Country: Russia
- Region: Ivanovo Oblast
- District: Lukhsky District
- Time zone: UTC+3:00

Blinikha (Russian: Блиниха) is a rural locality (a village) in Lukhsky District, Ivanovo Oblast, Russia. Population: 46 (2010 census);

== Geography ==
This rural locality is located 24 kilometres (15 mi) from Lukh (the district's administrative centre), 101 kilometres (63 mi) from Ivanovo (capital of Ivanovo Oblast) and 337 kilometres (209 mi) from Moscow. Bykovo is the nearest rural locality.
