= Ivashevo, Zavolzhsky District, Ivanovo Oblast =

Ivashevo Ивашево
- Village
- Location within Ivanovo Oblast Location within Russia
- Coordinates: 57°39′N 41°48′E
- Country: Russia
- Region: Ivanovo Oblast
- District: Zavolzhsky District
- Time zone: UTC+3:00

Ivashevo (Russian: Ивашево) is a rural locality (a village) in Zavolzhsky District, Ivanovo Oblast, Russia. Population: 71 (2010 census);

== Geography ==
This rural locality is located 27 km from Zavolzhsk (the district's administrative centre), 90 km from Ivanovo (capital of Ivanovo Oblast) and 327 km from Moscow. Knyazevo is the nearest rural locality.
