= Tarasovo, Ivanovo Oblast =

Tarasovo Тарасово
- Village
- Location within Ivanovo Oblast Location within Russia
- Coordinates: 57°06′N 40°43′E
- Country: Russia
- Region: Ivanovo Oblast
- District: Ivanovsky District
- Time zone: UTC+3:00

Tarasovo (Russian: Тарасово) is a rural locality (a village) in Ivanovsky District, Ivanovo Oblast, Russia. Population: 8 (2010 census);

== Geography ==
This rural locality is located 20 kilometres (12 mi) from Ivanovo (the district's administrative centre and capital of Ivanovo Oblast) and 241 kilometres (150 mi) from Moscow. Pirogovo is the nearest rural locality.
