= Skalozubka =

Skalozubka Скалозубка
- Village
- Location within Ivanovo Oblast Location within Russia
- Coordinates: 57°06′N 41°09′E
- Country: Russia
- Region: Ivanovo Oblast
- District: Ivanovsky District
- Time zone: UTC+3:00

Skalozubka (Russian: Скалозубка) is a rural locality (a village) in Ivanovsky District, Ivanovo Oblast, Russia. Population: 64 (2010 census);

== Geography ==
This rural locality is located 17 kilometres (11 mi) from Ivanovo (the district's administrative centre and capital of Ivanovo Oblast) and 261 kilometres (162 mi) from Moscow. Novino is the nearest rural locality.
