= Khudynino, Ivanovo Oblast =

Khudynino Худынино
- Village
- Location within Ivanovo Oblast Location within Russia
- Coordinates: 57°04′N 40°51′E
- Country: Russia
- Region: Ivanovo Oblast
- District: Ivanovsky District
- Time zone: UTC+3:00

Khudynino (Russian: Худынино) is a rural locality (a village) in Ivanovsky District, Ivanovo Oblast, Russia. Population: 13 (2010 census);

== Geography ==
This rural locality is located 11 kilometres (6.8 mi) from Ivanovo (the district's administrative centre and capital of Ivanovo Oblast) and 244 kilometres (152 mi) from Moscow. Uvod is the nearest rural locality.
