= Tyuryukovo =

Tyuryukovo Тюрюково
- Selo
- Location within Ivanovo Oblast Location within Russia
- Coordinates: 57°01′N 40°39′E
- Country: Russia
- Region: Ivanovo Oblast
- District: Ivanovsky District
- Time zone: UTC+3:00

Tyuryukovo (Russian: Тюрюково) is a rural locality (a selo) in Ivanovsky District, Ivanovo Oblast, Russia. Population: 97 (2010 census);

== Geography ==
This rural locality is located 19 kilometres (12 mi) from Ivanovo (the district's administrative centre and capital of Ivanovo Oblast) and 232 kilometres (144 mi) from Moscow. Polkhini is the nearest rural locality.
