= Putkovskaya =

Putkovskaya Путковская
- Village
- Location within Ivanovo Oblast Location within Russia
- Coordinates: 57°14′N 41°52′E
- Country: Russia
- Region: Ivanovo Oblast
- District: Vichugsky District
- Time zone: UTC+3:00

Putkovskaya (Russian: Путковская) is a rural locality (a village) in Vichugsky District, Ivanovo Oblast, Russia. Population: 117 (2010 census);
