= Izmaylovo, Ivanovo Oblast =

Izmaylovo Измайлово
- Village
- Location within Ivanovo Oblast Location within Russia
- Coordinates: 57°03′N 41°12′E
- Country: Russia
- Region: Ivanovo Oblast
- District: Ivanovsky District
- Time zone: UTC+3:00

Izmaylovo (Russian: Измайлово) is a rural locality (a village) in Ivanovsky District, Ivanovo Oblast, Russia. Population: 5 (2010 census);

== Geography ==
This rural locality is located 17 km from Ivanovo (the district's administrative centre and capital of Ivanovo Oblast) and 261 km from Moscow. Kalachevo is the nearest rural locality.
