= Podvyaznovsky =

Podvyaznovsky Подвязновский
- Selo
- Location within Ivanovo Oblast Location within Russia
- Coordinates: 56°58′N 41°07′E
- Country: Russia
- Region: Ivanovo Oblast
- District: Ivanovsky District
- Time zone: UTC+3:00

Podvyaznovsky (Russian: Подвязновский) is a rural locality (a selo) in Ivanovsky District, Ivanovo Oblast, Russia. Population: 2,477 (2010 census);

== Geography ==
This rural locality is located 10 km from Ivanovo (the district's administrative centre and capital of Ivanovo Oblast) and 252 km from Moscow. Zheleznodorozhny is the nearest rural locality.
