= Administrative divisions of Ivanovo Oblast =

Administrative divisions of Russian federal subject

Ivanovo Oblast Russia
- Administrative centre: Ivanovo

Administrative structure (as of 2012)
- Districts: 21
- Cities/towns: 17
- Urban-type settlements: 14
- Selsovets: 162

Municipal structure (as of 2002)
- Rural settlements: 3,015 (inhabited); 378 (uninhabited)

Ivanovo Oblast is a federal subject of Russia.

== Administrative and municipal divisions ==
- Cities and towns under the oblast's jurisdiction:
  - Ivanovo (Иваново) (administrative center)
    - city districts:
      - Frunzensky (Фрунзенский)
      - Leninsky (Ленинский)
      - Oktyabrsky (Октябрьский)
      - Sovetsky (Советский)
  - Furmanov (Фурманов)
  - Kineshma (Кинешма)
  - Shuya (Шуя)
  - Teykovo (Тейково)
  - Vichuga (Вичуга)
- Districts:
  - Furmanovsky (Фурмановский)
    - with 5 selsovets under the district's jurisdiction.
  - Gavrilovo-Posadsky (Гаврилово-Посадский)
    - Towns under the district's jurisdiction:
      - Gavrilov Posad (Гаврилов Посад)
    - Urban-type settlements under the district's jurisdiction:
      - Petrovsky (Петровский)
    - with 4 selsovets under the district's jurisdiction.
  - Ilyinsky (Ильинский)
    - Urban-type settlements under the district's jurisdiction:
      - Ilyinskoye-Khovanskoye (Ильинское-Хованское)
    - with 12 selsovets under the district's jurisdiction.
  - Ivanovsky (Ивановский)
    - Towns under the district's jurisdiction:
      - Kokhma (Кохма)
    - with 11 selsovets under the district's jurisdiction.
  - Kineshemsky (Кинешемский)
    - Towns under the district's jurisdiction:
      - Navoloki (Наволоки)
    - with 11 selsovets under the district's jurisdiction.
  - Komsomolsky (Комсомольский)
    - Towns under the district's jurisdiction:
      - Komsomolsk (Комсомольск)
    - with 5 selsovets under the district's jurisdiction.
  - Lezhnevsky (Лежневский)
    - Urban-type settlements under the district's jurisdiction:
      - Lezhnevo (Лежнево)
    - with 7 selsovets under the district's jurisdiction.
  - Lukhsky (Лухский)
    - Urban-type settlements under the district's jurisdiction:
      - Lukh (Лух)
    - with 6 selsovets under the district's jurisdiction.
  - Palekhsky (Палехский)
    - Urban-type settlements under the district's jurisdiction:
      - Palekh (Палех)
    - with 9 selsovets under the district's jurisdiction.
  - Pestyakovsky (Пестяковский)
    - Urban-type settlements under the district's jurisdiction:
      - Pestyaki (Пестяки)
    - with 5 selsovets under the district's jurisdiction.
  - Privolzhsky (Приволжский)
    - Towns under the district's jurisdiction:
      - Plyos (Плёс)
      - Privolzhsk (Приволжск)
    - with 9 selsovets under the district's jurisdiction.
  - Puchezhsky (Пучежский)
    - Towns under the district's jurisdiction:
      - Puchezh (Пучеж)
    - with 4 selsovets under the district's jurisdiction.
  - Rodnikovsky (Родниковский)
    - Towns under the district's jurisdiction:
      - Rodniki (Родники)
    - with 13 selsovets under the district's jurisdiction.
  - Savinsky (Савинский)
    - Urban-type settlements under the district's jurisdiction:
      - Arkhipovka (Архиповка)
      - Savino (Савино)
    - with 4 selsovets under the district's jurisdiction.
  - Shuysky (Шуйский)
    - Urban-type settlements under the district's jurisdiction:
      - Kolobovo (Колобово)
    - with 7 selsovets under the district's jurisdiction.
  - Teykovsky (Тейковский)
    - Urban-type settlements under the district's jurisdiction:
      - Nerl (Нерль)
    - with 9 selsovets under the district's jurisdiction.
  - Verkhnelandekhovsky (Верхнеландеховский)
    - Urban-type settlements under the district's jurisdiction:
      - Verkhny Landekh (Верхний Ландех)
    - with 3 selsovets under the district's jurisdiction.
  - Vichugsky (Вичугский)
    - Urban-type settlements under the district's jurisdiction:
      - Kamenka (Каменка)
      - Novopistsovo (Новописцово)
      - Staraya Vichuga (Старая Вичуга)
    - with 9 selsovets under the district's jurisdiction.
  - Yuryevetsky (Юрьевецкий)
    - Towns under the district's jurisdiction:
      - Yuryevets (Юрьевец)
    - with 6 selsovets under the district's jurisdiction.
  - Yuzhsky (Южский)
    - Towns under the district's jurisdiction:
      - Yuzha (Южа)
    - with 11 selsovets under the district's jurisdiction.
  - Zavolzhsky (Заволжский)
    - Towns under the district's jurisdiction:
      - Zavolzhsk (Заволжск)
    - with 12 selsovets under the district's jurisdiction.
