= Stanovoy (rural locality) =

Stanovoy (Russian: Становой; masculine), Stanovaya (Становая; feminine), or Stanovoye (Становое; neuter) is the name of several rural localities in Russia.

== Belgorod Oblast ==
As of 2022, four rural localities in Belgorod Oblast bear this name:

- Stanovoye, Borisovsky District, Belgorod Oblast, a khutor in Strigunovsky Rural Okrug of Borisovsky District
- Stanovoye, Chernyansky District, Belgorod Oblast, a selo in Chernyansky District
- Stanovoye (Solontsinskoye Rural Settlement), Veydelevsky District, Belgorod Oblast, a khutor in Veydelevsky District; municipally, a part of Solontsinskoye Rural Settlement of that district
- Stanovoye (Nikolayevskoye Rural Settlement), Veydelevsky District, Belgorod Oblast, a khutor in Veydelevsky District; municipally, a part of Nikolayevskoye Rural Settlement of that district

== Ivanovo Oblast ==
As of 2022, three rural localities in Ivanovo Oblast bear this name:

- Stanovoye, Ivanovsky District, Ivanovo Oblast, a village in Ivanovsky District
- Stanovoye, Komsomolsky District, Ivanovo Oblast, a village in Komsomolsky District
- Stanovoye, Rodnikovsky District, Ivanovo Oblast, a village in Rodnikovsky District

== Kaliningrad Oblast ==
As of 2022, one rural locality in Kaliningrad Oblast bears this name:

- Stanovoye, Kaliningrad Oblast, a settlement in Zhilinsky Rural Okrug of Nemansky District

== Kaluga Oblast ==
As of 2022, one rural locality in Kaluga Oblast bears this name:

- Stanovoye, Kaluga Oblast, a village in Iznoskovsky District

== Kurgan Oblast ==
As of 2022, two rural localities in Kurgan Oblast bear this name:

- Stanovoye, Kurgan Oblast, a selo in Stanovskoy Selsoviet of Tselinny District
- Stanovaya, Kurgan Oblast, a village in Stanovskoy Selsoviet of Ketovsky District

== Kursk Oblast ==
As of 2022, three rural localities in Kursk Oblast bear this name:

- Stanovoye, Cheremisinovsky District, Kursk Oblast, a village in Yefremovsky Selsoviet of Cheremisinovsky District
- Stanovoye, Ponyrovsky District, Kursk Oblast, a selo in Stanovskoy Selsoviet of Ponyrovsky District
- Stanovoye, Timsky District, Kursk Oblast, a selo in Stanovskoy Selsoviet of Timsky District

== Lipetsk Oblast ==
As of 2022, one rural locality in Lipetsk Oblast bears this name:

- Stanovoye, Lipetsk Oblast, a selo in Stanovlyansky Selsoviet of Stanovlyansky District

== Moscow Oblast ==
As of 2022, one rural locality in Moscow Oblast bears this name:

- Stanovoye, Moscow Oblast, a village in Sofyinskoye Rural Settlement of Ramensky District

== Oryol Oblast ==
As of 2022, five rural localities in Oryol Oblast bear this name:

- Stanovoy, Oryol Oblast, a settlement in Novosinetsky Selsoviet of Bolkhovsky District
- Stanovoye, Novosilsky District, Oryol Oblast, a selo in Glubkovsky Selsoviet of Novosilsky District
- Stanovoye, Stanovo-Kolodezsky Selsoviet, Orlovsky District, Oryol Oblast, a village in Stanovo-Kolodezsky Selsoviet of Orlovsky District
- Stanovoye, Stanovskoy Selsoviet, Orlovsky District, Oryol Oblast, a village in Stanovskoy Selsoviet of Orlovsky District
- Stanovoye, Zalegoshchensky District, Oryol Oblast, a village in Bortnovsky Selsoviet of Zalegoshchensky District

== Sverdlovsk Oblast ==
As of 2022, one rural locality in Sverdlovsk Oblast bears this name:

- Stanovaya, Sverdlovsk Oblast, a settlement under the administrative jurisdiction of the Town of Beryozovsky

== Tula Oblast ==
As of 2022, one rural locality in Tula Oblast bears this name:

- Stanovaya, Tula Oblast, a village in Yaltinsky Rural Okrug of Volovsky District

== Vologda Oblast ==
As of 2022, five rural localities in Vologda Oblast bear this name:

- Stanovoye (crossing loop), Lezhsky Selsoviet, Gryazovetsky District, Vologda Oblast, a crossing loop in Lezhsky Selsoviet of Gryazovetsky District
- Stanovoye (village), Lezhsky Selsoviet, Gryazovetsky District, Vologda Oblast, a village in Lezhsky Selsoviet of Gryazovetsky District
- Stanovoye, Vokhtogsky Selsoviet, Gryazovetsky District, Vologda Oblast, a village in Vokhtogsky Selsoviet of Gryazovetsky District
- Stanovoye, Mezhdurechensky District, Vologda Oblast, a village in Sheybukhtovsky Selsoviet of Mezhdurechensky District
- Stanovaya, Vologda Oblast, a village in Andreyevsky Selsoviet of Vashkinsky District

== Voronezh Oblast ==
As of 2022, one rural locality in Voronezh Oblast bears this name:

- Stanovoy, Voronezh Oblast, a khutor in Semeyskoye Rural Settlement of Podgorensky District
