= Nonna Muravyova =

- Нонна Муравьёва
- Muravyova in the 1950s

Chairman of the Central Auditing Commission of the Communist Party of the Soviet Union
- In office October 31, 1961 – March 29, 1966
- Preceded by: Alexander Gorkin
- Succeeded by: Gennady Sizov

Minister of Social Security of the Russian Soviet Federative Socialist Republic
- In office April 21, 1952 – December 12, 1961
- Preceded by: Alexey Sukhov
- Succeeded by: Lydia Lykova

Personal details
- Born: August 13, 1906 Kamenka, Kineshemsky Uyezd, Kostroma Governorate, Russian Empire
- Died: January 2, 1986 (aged 79) Moscow, RSFSR, Soviet Union
- Resting place: Novodevichy Cemetery
- Party: CPSU (1926–1986)
- Education: All–Union Industrial Academy of Textile Industry Named After Vyacheslav Molotov
- Awards: Order of Lenin; Order of the October Revolution; Order of the Red Banner of Labour; Order of the Badge of Honour Medals: Medal "In Commemoration of the 100th Anniversary of the Birth of Vladimir Ilyich Lenin"; Medal "For Valiant Labour in the Great Patriotic War 1941–1945"; Jubilee Medal "Twenty Years of Victory in the Great Patriotic War 1941–1945"; Jubilee Medal "Thirty Years of Victory in the Great Patriotic War 1941–1945"; Jubilee Medal "Forty Years of Victory in the Great Patriotic War 1941–1945"; Medal "Veteran of Labour"

Nonna Aleksandrovna Muravyova (Russian: Нонна Александровна Муравьёва; August 13, 1906 – January 2, 1986) was a Soviet state, party and public figure. She served as Minister of Social Security of the Russian Soviet Federative Socialist Republic (1952–1961) and Chairman of the Central Auditing Commission of the Communist Party of the Soviet Union (1961–1966).

== Early career ==
She was born into a working-class family.

In 1920–1923, she worked at a dyeing and finishing factory in Kamenka, where she joined the Russian Communist Youth Union. In 1923–1926, she worked at a linen factory in Novopistsovo.

Here she plunges headlong into the seething social life characteristic of the youth of the Russian Communist Youth Union of the 1920s: she participates in meetings, Sunday work, a sports club, and in the oral newspaper Blue Blouse. Together with her peers, she more than once went with amateur concerts to the sponsored villages of Afonovo, Nasakino, Oltuhovo, etc. Nonna becomes a pioneer leader – one of the first in the Vichuga Region. It was at this time that her remarkable organizational abilities began to manifest.

— Kirill Baldin "Vichuga Side", Ivanovo, 2002, Page 217

She became a member of the All–Union Communist Party (Bolsheviks) in 1926. In 1938, she graduated from the All–Union Industrial Academy of Light Industry Named After Vyacheslav Molotov.

In 1926–1930, she was a teacher at the orphanage "Communa No. 1", which was first located in Vichuga and was later transferred to Staraya Vichuga.

From 1930, she was engaged in party work.

- 1930–1931 – Head of the Mass Propaganda Sector of the party organization of the Krasin Factory in Staraya Vichuga;
- 1931 – Instructor of the women's department of the Ivanovo Regional Committee of the All–Union Communist Party (Bolsheviks);
- 1932–1934 – Head of the women's department of the Ivanovo Regional Committee of the All–Union Communist Party (Bolsheviks).

== In leadership positions ==
At the 2nd Peace Conference, 1950

- 1938–1939 – Director of the Spinning and Weaving Factory "Hammer and Sickle" (Pushkino, Moscow Region);
- 1939–1944 – Deputy People's Commissar of Light Industry of the Russian Soviet Federative Socialist Republic;
- 1944–1946 – Director of the Research Institute of Popular Fiber;
- 1946–1952 – Chairman of the Central Committee of the Trade Union of Textile Workers;
- 1952–1961 – Minister of Social Security of the Russian Soviet Federative Socialist Republic;
- 1961–1966 – Chairman of the Central Auditing Commission of the Communist Party of the Soviet Union;
- 1961–1966 – Chairman of the Commission for the Establishment of Personal Pensions Under the Council of Ministers of the Soviet Union.

From July 1966, she was a member of the Party Control Committee under the Central Committee of the Communist Party of the Soviet Union.

She was a member of the Central Auditing Commission of the Communist Party of the Soviet Union (1956–1971), a deputy of the Supreme Soviet of the Soviet Union of the 6th Convocation, and a deputy of the Supreme Soviet of the Russian Soviet Federative Socialist Republic of the 3rd–5th Convocations.

She retired in 1974. She was Deputy Chairman of the Society of Soviet–Finnish Friendship and Cultural Relations and a member of the Committee of Soviet Women.

In 1982, the Nonna Muravyova Prize, awarded to the city's best women activists, was established in Vichuga.

She was buried at the Novodevichy Cemetery.

== Awards and titles ==
- Order of the Red Banner of Labour (August 15, 1956);
- Order of the Badge of Honour (July 20, 1940) – for overfulfillment of the 1939 Plan, successful work and initiative in fulfilling special orders of the Government (for light industry);
- Three more orders;
- Medals;
- Honorary citizen of Vichuga.

== Sources ==
- Nonna Muravyova. "New Law on Pensions", Moscow, State Publishing House of Political Literature, 1956
- Social Security in the Soviet Union (Report by Nonna Muravyova, Minister of Social Security of the Russian Soviet Federative Socialist Republic), Moscow, 1956
- Sergey Gorbunov, Yu. S. Lyubichev. "Proud Destiny" (Documentary Sketch About the Life And Work of Nonna Muravyova), Yaroslavl, Verkhne–Volzhsky Publishing House, 1992
- Buravina E. V. Review of Documents of the Fund of Statesman and Public Figure Nonna Muravyova (1900–1986) According to Documents of the State Archives of the Russian Federation: Thesis / Russian State University for the Humanities – Moscow, 1995
- Obituary // "Pravda", 1986, No. 4 of January 4
