= Kolyagino, Yuzhsky District =

Kolyagino Колягино
- Village
- Location within Ivanovo Oblast Location within Russia
- Coordinates: 56°39′N 41°45′E
- Country: Russia
- Region: Ivanovo Oblast
- District: Yuzhsky District
- Time zone: UTC+3:00

Kolyagino (Russian: Колягино) is a rural locality (a village) in Yuzhsky District, Ivanovo Oblast, Russia. Population: 5 (2010 census);

== Geography ==
This rural locality is located 17 kilometres (11 mi) from Yuzha (the district's administrative centre), 61 kilometres (38 mi) from Ivanovo (capital of Ivanovo Oblast) and 272 kilometres (169 mi) from Moscow. Domnino is the nearest rural locality.
