= Yurtsyno =

Yurtsyno Юрцыно
- Village
- Location within Ivanovo Oblast Location within Russia
- Coordinates: 57°08′N 40°31′E
- Country: Russia
- Region: Ivanovo Oblast
- District: Komsomolsky District
- Time zone: UTC+3:00

Yurtsyno (Russian: Юрцыно) is a rural locality (a village) in Komsomolsky District, Ivanovo Oblast, Russia. Population: 43 (2010 census);

== Geography ==
This rural locality is located 16 kilometres (9.9 mi) from Komsomolsk (the district's administrative centre), 31 kilometres (19 mi) from Ivanovo (capital of Ivanovo Oblast) and 234 kilometres (145 mi) from Moscow. Sedelnitsy is the nearest rural locality.
