= Pistsovo =

Pistsovo Писцово
- Village
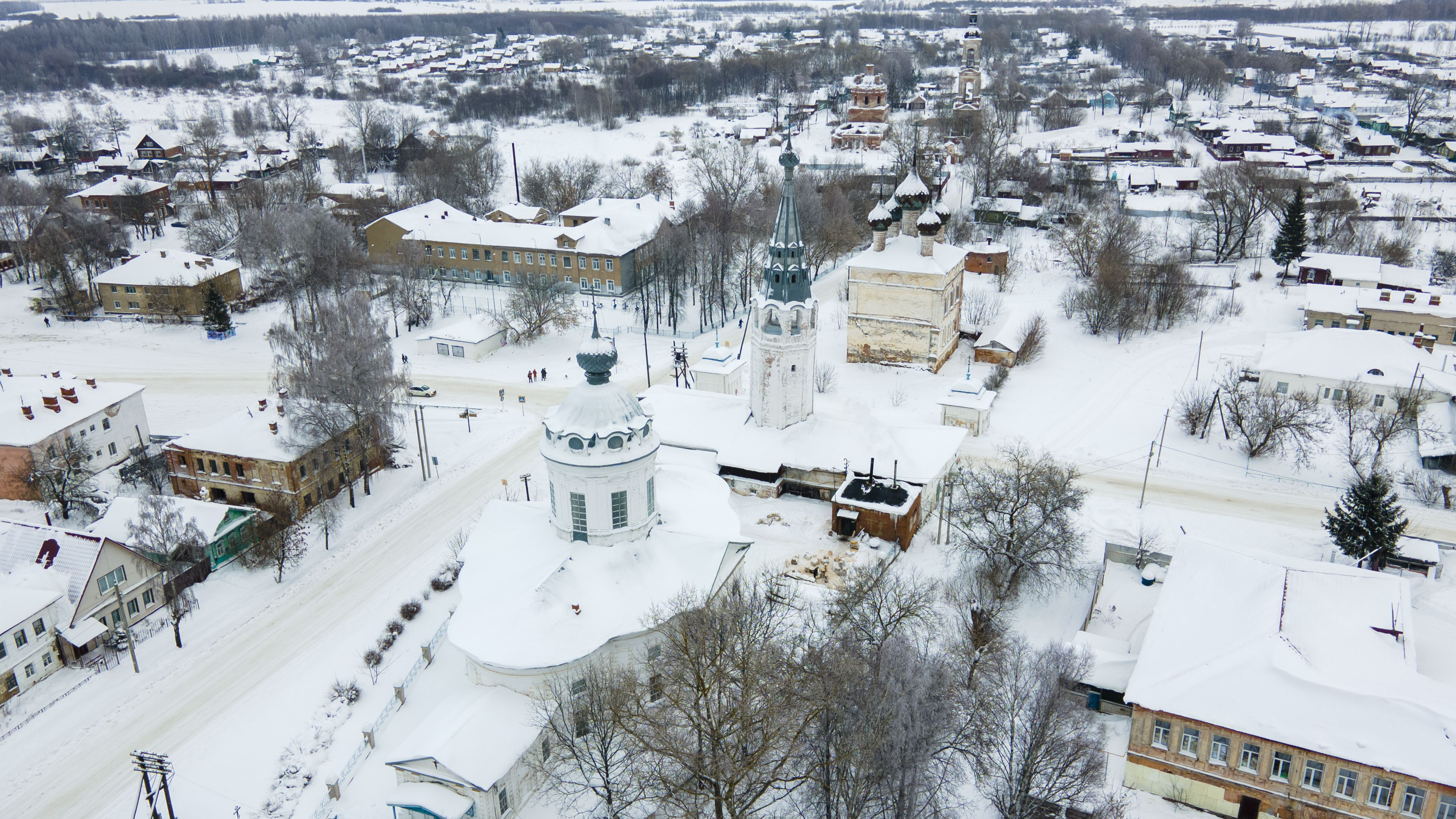

- Location within Ivanovo Oblast Location within Russia
- Coordinates: 57°10′N 40°31′E
- Country: Russia
- Region: Ivanovo Oblast
- District: Komsomolsky District
- Time zone: UTC+3:00

Pistsovo (Russian: Писцово) is a rural locality (a selo) in Komsomolsky District, Ivanovo Oblast, Russia. Population:3,717 (2021 census);

== Geography ==
This rural locality is located 19 kilometres (12 mi) from Komsomolsk (the district's administrative centre), 34 kilometres (21 mi) from Ivanovo (capital of Ivanovo Oblast) and 236 kilometres (147 mi) from Moscow. Dmitriyevskoye is the nearest rural locality.
