= Maksimovo =

Maksimovo Максимово
- Village
- Location within Ivanovo Oblast Location within Russia
- Coordinates: 56°37′N 41°43′E
- Country: Russia
- Region: Ivanovo Oblast
- District: Yuzhsky District
- Time zone: UTC+3:00

Maksimovo (Russian: Максимово) is a rural locality (a village) in Yuzhsky District, Ivanovo Oblast, Russia. Population: 8 (2010 census);

== Geography ==
This rural locality is located 18 kilometres (11 mi) from Yuzha (the district's administrative centre), 62 kilometres (39 mi) from Ivanovo (capital of Ivanovo Oblast) and 269 kilometres (167 mi) from Moscow. Kruglovo is the nearest rural locality.
