= Ryapolovo, Yuzhsky District =

Ryapolovo Ряполово
- Village
- Location within Ivanovo Oblast Location within Russia
- Coordinates: 56°41′N 41°42′E
- Country: Russia
- Region: Ivanovo Oblast
- District: Yuzhsky District
- Time zone: UTC+3:00

Ryapolovo (Russian: Ряполово) is a rural locality (a village) in Yuzhsky District, Ivanovo Oblast, Russia. Population: 28 (2010 census);

== Geography ==
This rural locality is located 22 kilometres (14 mi) from Yuzha (the district's administrative centre), 56 kilometres (35 mi) from Ivanovo (capital of Ivanovo Oblast) and 270 kilometres (170 mi) from Moscow. Meshalovka is the nearest rural locality.
