= Gubino, Ivanovo Oblast =

Gubino Губино
- Village
- Location within Ivanovo Oblast Location within Russia
- Coordinates: 56°59′N 40°32′E
- Country: Russia
- Region: Ivanovo Oblast
- District: Komsomolsky District
- Time zone: UTC+3:00

Gubino (Russian: Губино) is a rural locality (a village) in Komsomolsky District, Ivanovo Oblast, Russia. Population: 8 (2010 census);

== Geography ==
This rural locality is located 10 kilometres (6.2 mi) from Komsomolsk (the district's administrative centre), 26 kilometres (16 mi) from Ivanovo (capital of Ivanovo Oblast) and 224 kilometres (139 mi) from Moscow. Vorontsovo is the nearest rural locality.
