= Irykhovo =

Irykhovo Ирыхово
- Village
- Location within Ivanovo Oblast Location within Russia
- Coordinates: 56°37′N 41°50′E
- Country: Russia
- Region: Ivanovo Oblast
- District: Yuzhsky District
- Time zone: UTC+3:00

Irykhovo (Russian: Ирыхово) is a rural locality (a village) in Yuzhsky District, Ivanovo Oblast, Russia. Population: 25 (2010 census);

== Geography ==
This rural locality is located 12 kilometres (7.5 mi) from Yuzha (the district's administrative centre), 67 kilometres (42 mi) from Ivanovo (capital of Ivanovo Oblast) and 276 kilometres (171 mi) from Moscow. Nagornovo is the nearest rural locality.
