= Glushitsy, Ivanovo Oblast =

Glushitsy Глушицы
- Village
- Location within Ivanovo Oblast Location within Russia
- Coordinates: 56°28′N 41°58′E
- Country: Russia
- Region: Ivanovo Oblast
- District: Yuzhsky District
- Time zone: UTC+3:00

Glushitsy (Russian: Глушицы) is a rural locality (a village) in Yuzhsky District, Ivanovo Oblast, Russia. Population: 159 (2010 census);

== Geography ==
This rural locality is located 12 kilometres (7.5 mi) from Yuzha (the district's administrative centre), 84 kilometres (52 mi) from Ivanovo (capital of Ivanovo Oblast) and 279 kilometres (173 mi) from Moscow. Nikulikha is the nearest rural locality.
