= Berezniki, Komsomolsky District, Ivanovo Oblast =

Berezniki Березники
- Village
- Location within Ivanovo Oblast Location within Russia
- Coordinates: 57°11′N 40°23′E
- Country: Russia
- Region: Ivanovo Oblast
- District: Komsomolsky District
- Time zone: UTC+3:00

Berezniki (Russian: Березники) is a rural locality (a selo) in Komsomolsky District, Ivanovo Oblast, Russia. Population: 79 (2010 census);

== Geography ==
This rural locality is located 19 kilometres (12 mi) from Komsomolsk (the district's administrative centre), 42 kilometres (26 mi) from Ivanovo (capital of Ivanovo Oblast) and 231 kilometres (144 mi) from Moscow. Yakshino is the nearest rural locality.
