= Koptevo, Komsomolsky District, Ivanovo Oblast =

Koptevo Коптево
- Village
- Location within Ivanovo Oblast Location within Russia
- Coordinates: 57°05′N 40°22′E
- Country: Russia
- Region: Ivanovo Oblast
- District: Komsomolsky District
- Time zone: UTC+3:00

Koptevo (Russian: Коптево) is a rural locality (a village) in Komsomolsky District, Ivanovo Oblast, Russia. Population: 9 (2010 census);

== Geography ==
This rural locality is located 6 kilometres (3.7 mi) from Komsomolsk (the district's administrative centre), 37 kilometres (23 mi) from Ivanovo (capital of Ivanovo Oblast) and 223 kilometres (139 mi) from Moscow. Degtyarka is the nearest rural locality.
