= Stepashevo =

Stepashevo Степашево
- Village
- Location within Ivanovo Oblast Location within Russia
- Coordinates: 57°16′N 40°31′E
- Country: Russia
- Region: Ivanovo Oblast
- District: Komsomolsky District
- Time zone: UTC+3:00

Stepashevo (Russian: Степашево) is a rural locality (a village) in Komsomolsky District, Ivanovo Oblast, Russia. Population: 100 (2010 census);

== Geography ==
This rural locality is located 29 kilometres (18 mi) from Komsomolsk (the district's administrative centre), 40 kilometres (25 mi) from Ivanovo (capital of Ivanovo Oblast) and 243 kilometres (151 mi) from Moscow. Zarechye is the nearest rural locality.
