= Kosiki, Ivanovo Oblast =

Kosiki Косики
- Village
- Location within Ivanovo Oblast Location within Russia
- Coordinates: 56°23′N 42°00′E
- Country: Russia
- Region: Ivanovo Oblast
- District: Yuzhsky District
- Time zone: UTC+3:00

Kosiki (Russian: Косики) is a rural locality (a village) in Yuzhsky District, Ivanovo Oblast, Russia. Population: 5 (2010 census);

== Geography ==
This rural locality is located 22 kilometres (14 mi) from Yuzha (the district's administrative centre), 93 kilometres (58 mi) from Ivanovo (capital of Ivanovo Oblast) and 280 kilometres (170 mi) from Moscow. Pavlitsy is the nearest rural locality.
