= Mugreyevsky =

Mugreyevsky Мугреевский
- Village
- Location within Ivanovo Oblast Location within Russia
- Coordinates: 56°35′N 42°20′E
- Country: Russia
- Region: Ivanovo Oblast
- District: Yuzhsky District
- Time zone: UTC+3:00

Mugreyevsky (Russian: Мугреевский) is a rural locality (a selo) in Yuzhsky District, Ivanovo Oblast, Russia. Population: 789 (2010 census);

== Geography ==
This rural locality is located 21 kilometres (13 mi) from Yuzha (the district's administrative centre), 95 kilometres (59 mi) from Ivanovo (capital of Ivanovo Oblast) and 304 kilometres (189 mi) from Moscow. Kochergino is the nearest rural locality.
