= Nefyodovo, Yuzhsky District =

Nefyodovo Нефёдово
- Village
- Location within Ivanovo Oblast Location within Russia
- Coordinates: 56°35′N 42°00′E
- Country: Russia
- Region: Ivanovo Oblast
- District: Yuzhsky District
- Time zone: UTC+3:00

Nefyodovo (Russian: Нефёдово) is a rural locality (a village) in Yuzhsky District, Ivanovo Oblast, Russia. Population: 334 (2010 census);

== Geography ==
This rural locality is located 2 kilometres (1.2 mi) from Yuzha (the district's administrative centre), 77 kilometres (48 mi) from Ivanovo (capital of Ivanovo Oblast) and 285 kilometres (177 mi) from Moscow. Yuzha is the nearest rural locality.
