= Podozyorsky =

Podozyorsky Подозёрский
- Village
- Location within Ivanovo Oblast Location within Russia
- Coordinates: 57°12′N 40°20′E
- Country: Russia
- Region: Ivanovo Oblast
- District: Komsomolsky District
- Time zone: UTC+3:00

Podozyorsky (Russian: Подозёрский) is a rural locality (a selo) in Komsomolsky District, Ivanovo Oblast, Russia. Population: 1,067 (2010 census);

== Geography ==
This rural locality is located 21 kilometres (13 mi) from Komsomolsk (the district's administrative centre), 45 kilometres (28 mi) from Ivanovo (capital of Ivanovo Oblast) and 231 kilometres (144 mi) from Moscow. Koromyslovo is the nearest rural locality.
