= Sedelnitsy =

Sedelnitsy Седельницы
- Village
- Location within Ivanovo Oblast Location within Russia
- Coordinates: 57°08′N 40°32′E
- Country: Russia
- Region: Ivanovo Oblast
- District: Komsomolsky District
- Time zone: UTC+3:00

Sedelnitsy (Russian: Седельницы) is a rural locality (a selo) in Komsomolsky District, Ivanovo Oblast, Russia. Population: 307 (2010 census);

== Geography ==
This rural locality is located 16 kilometres (9.9 mi) from Komsomolsk (the district's administrative centre), 30 kilometres (19 mi) from Ivanovo (capital of Ivanovo Oblast) and 235 kilometres (146 mi) from Moscow. Yurtsino is the nearest rural locality.
