= Yanovo, Ivanovo Oblast =

Yanovo Яново
- Village
- Location within Ivanovo Oblast Location within Russia
- Coordinates: 57°08′N 40°40′E
- Country: Russia
- Region: Ivanovo Oblast
- District: Komsomolsky District
- Time zone: UTC+3:00

Yanovo (Russian: Яново) is a rural locality (a village) in Komsomolsky District, Ivanovo Oblast, Russia. Population: 34 (2010 census);

== Geography ==
This rural locality is located 22 kilometres (14 mi) from Komsomolsk (the district's administrative centre), 25 kilometres (16 mi) from Ivanovo (capital of Ivanovo Oblast) and 240 kilometres (150 mi) from Moscow. Marshovo is the nearest rural locality.
