= Mordovskoye, Ivanovo Oblast =

Mordovskoye Мордовское
- Village
- Location within Ivanovo Oblast Location within Russia
- Coordinates: 56°33′N 41°51′E
- Country: Russia
- Region: Ivanovo Oblast
- District: Yuzhsky District
- Time zone: UTC+3:00

Mordovskoye (Russian: Мордовское) is a rural locality (a village) in Yuzhsky District, Ivanovo Oblast, Russia. Population: 116 (2010 census);

== Geography ==
This rural locality is located 10 kilometres (6.2 mi) from Yuzha (the district's administrative centre), 73 kilometres (45 mi) from Ivanovo (capital of Ivanovo Oblast) and 275 kilometres (171 mi) from Moscow. Steklovsky is the nearest rural locality.
