= Ivashkovo, Komsomolsky District, Ivanovo Oblast =

Ivashkovo Ивашково
- Village
- Location within Ivanovo Oblast Location within Russia
- Coordinates: 56°57′N 40°15′E
- Country: Russia
- Region: Ivanovo Oblast
- District: Komsomolsky District
- Time zone: UTC+3:00

Ivashkovo (Russian: Ивашково) is a rural locality (a village) in Komsomolsky District, Ivanovo Oblast, Russia. Population: 15 (2010 census);

== Geography ==
This rural locality is located 10 kilometres (6.2 mi) from Komsomolsk (the district's administrative centre), 43 kilometres (27 mi) from Ivanovo (capital of Ivanovo Oblast) and 209 kilometres (130 mi) from Moscow. Yaksayevo is the nearest rural locality.
