= Rozhdestvenno =

Rozhdestvenno Рождественно
- Village
- Location within Ivanovo Oblast Location within Russia
- Coordinates: 57°00′N 40°11′E
- Country: Russia
- Region: Ivanovo Oblast
- District: Komsomolsky District
- Time zone: UTC+3:00

Rozhdestvenno (Russian: Рождественно) is a rural locality (a village) in Komsomolsky District, Ivanovo Oblast, Russia. Population: 68 (2010 census);

== Geography ==
This rural locality is located 12 kilometres (7.5 mi) from Komsomolsk (the district's administrative centre), 47 kilometres (29 mi) from Ivanovo (capital of Ivanovo Oblast) and 209 kilometres (130 mi) from Moscow. Svetikovo is the nearest rural locality.
