= Rebrovo, Yuzhsky District =

Rebrovo Реброво
- Village
- Location within Ivanovo Oblast Location within Russia
- Coordinates: 56°34′N 41°57′E
- Country: Russia
- Region: Ivanovo Oblast
- District: Yuzhsky District
- Time zone: UTC+3:00

Rebrovo (Russian: Реброво) is a rural locality (a village) in Yuzhsky District, Ivanovo Oblast, Russia. Population: 72 (2010 census);

== Geography ==
This rural locality is located 3 kilometres (1.9 mi) from Yuzha (the district's administrative centre), 77 kilometres (48 mi) from Ivanovo (capital of Ivanovo Oblast) and 281 kilometres (175 mi) from Moscow. Tarantayevo is the nearest rural locality.
