= Marshovo =

Marshovo Маршово
- Village
- Location within Ivanovo Oblast Location within Russia
- Coordinates: 57°08′N 40°39′E
- Country: Russia
- Region: Ivanovo Oblast
- District: Komsomolsky District
- Time zone: UTC+3:00

Marshovo (Russian: Маршово) is a rural locality (a selo) in Komsomolsky District, Ivanovo Oblast, Russia. Population: 10 (2010 census);

== Geography ==
This rural locality is located 20 kilometres (12 mi) from Komsomolsk (the district's administrative centre), 25 kilometres (16 mi) from Ivanovo (capital of Ivanovo Oblast) and 239 kilometres (149 mi) from Moscow. Stipirevo is the nearest rural locality.
