= Yuzhsky =

Yuzhsky (masculine), Yuzhskaya (feminine), or Yuzhskoye (neuter) may refer to:

- Yuzhsky District, a district of Ivanovo Oblast, Russia
- Yuzhskoye Urban Settlement, a municipal formation which the town of Yuzha and five rural localities in Yuzhsky District of Ivanovo Oblast, Russia are incorporated as
