= Gubtsevo, Ivanovo Oblast =

Gubtsevo Губцево
- Village
- Location within Ivanovo Oblast Location within Russia
- Coordinates: 57°00′N 40°05′E
- Country: Russia
- Region: Ivanovo Oblast
- District: Komsomolsky District
- Time zone: UTC+3:00

Gubtsevo (Russian: Губцево) is a rural locality (a village) in Komsomolsky District, Ivanovo Oblast, Russia. Population: 19 (2010 census);

== Geography ==
This rural locality is located 18 kilometres (11 mi) from Komsomolsk (the district's administrative centre), 54 kilometres (34 mi) from Ivanovo (capital of Ivanovo Oblast) and 204 kilometres (127 mi) from Moscow. Polyanki is the nearest rural locality.
