= Istoki =

Istoki Истоки
- Village
- Location within Ivanovo Oblast Location within Russia
- Coordinates: 56°41′N 42°08′E
- Country: Russia
- Region: Ivanovo Oblast
- District: Yuzhsky District
- Time zone: UTC+3:00

Istoki (Russian: Истоки) is a rural locality (a village) in Yuzhsky District, Ivanovo Oblast, Russia. Population: 16 (2010 census);

== Geography ==
This rural locality is located 13 kilometres (8.1 mi) from Yuzha (the district's administrative centre), 79 kilometres (49 mi) from Ivanovo (capital of Ivanovo Oblast) and 295 kilometres (183 mi) from Moscow. Lyogkogo is the nearest rural locality.
