= Shchukovo =

Shchukovo Щуково
- Village
- Location within Ivanovo Oblast Location within Russia
- Coordinates: 57°03′N 40°10′E
- Country: Russia
- Region: Ivanovo Oblast
- District: Komsomolsky District
- Time zone: UTC+3:00

Shchukovo (Russian: Щуково) is a rural locality (a selo) in Komsomolsky District, Ivanovo Oblast, Russia. Population: 7 (2010 census);

== Geography ==
This rural locality is located 14 kilometres (8.7 mi) from Komsomolsk (the district's administrative centre), 49 kilometres (30 mi) from Ivanovo (capital of Ivanovo Oblast) and 211 kilometres (131 mi) from Moscow. Bugrino is the nearest rural locality.
