= Izotino =

Izotino Изотино
- Village
- Location within Ivanovo Oblast Location within Russia
- Coordinates: 56°33′N 41°41′E
- Country: Russia
- Region: Ivanovo Oblast
- District: Yuzhsky District
- Time zone: UTC+3:00

Izotino (Russian: Изотино) is a rural locality (a selo) in Yuzhsky District, Ivanovo Oblast, Russia. Population: 171 (2010 census);

== Geography ==
This rural locality is located 20 kilometres (12 mi) from Yuzha (the district's administrative centre), 67 kilometres (42 mi) from Ivanovo (capital of Ivanovo Oblast) and 265 kilometres (165 mi) from Moscow. Mikheyevo is the nearest rural locality.
