= Yaksayevo =

Yaksayevo Яксаево
- Village
- Location within Ivanovo Oblast Location within Russia
- Coordinates: 56°56′N 40°14′E
- Country: Russia
- Region: Ivanovo Oblast
- District: Komsomolsky District
- Time zone: UTC+3:00

Yaksayevo (Russian: Яксаево) is a rural locality (a village) in Komsomolsky District, Ivanovo Oblast, Russia. Population: 76 (2010 census);

== Geography ==
This rural locality is located 12 kilometres (7.5 mi) from Komsomolsk (the district's administrative centre), 45 kilometres (28 mi) from Ivanovo (capital of Ivanovo Oblast) and 207 kilometres (129 mi) from Moscow. Ivashkovo is the nearest rural locality.
