= Gorki, Yuzhsky District =

Gorki Горки
- Village
- Location within Ivanovo Oblast Location within Russia
- Coordinates: 56°42′N 42°04′E
- Country: Russia
- Region: Ivanovo Oblast
- District: Yuzhsky District
- Time zone: UTC+3:00

Gorki (Russian: Горки) is a rural locality (a village) in Yuzhsky District, Ivanovo Oblast, Russia. Population: 11 (2010 census);

== Geography ==
This rural locality is located 15 kilometres (9.3 mi) from Yuzha (the district's administrative centre), 75 kilometres (47 mi) from Ivanovo (capital of Ivanovo Oblast) and 292 kilometres (181 mi) from Moscow. Gruzdevo is the nearest rural locality.
