= Koromyslovo =

Koromyslovo Коромыслово
- Village
- Location within Ivanovo Oblast Location within Russia
- Coordinates: 57°12′N 40°19′E
- Country: Russia
- Region: Ivanovo Oblast
- District: Komsomolsky District
- Time zone: UTC+3:00

Koromyslovo (Russian: Коромыслово) is a rural locality (a village) in Komsomolsky District, Ivanovo Oblast, Russia. Population: 488 (2010 census);

== Geography ==
This rural locality is located 21 kilometres (13 mi) from Komsomolsk (the district's administrative centre), 45 kilometres (28 mi) from Ivanovo (capital of Ivanovo Oblast) and 230 kilometres (140 mi) from Moscow. Chernyatino is the nearest rural locality.
