= Vzvoz =

Vzvoz Взвоз
- Village
- Location within Ivanovo Oblast Location within Russia
- Coordinates: 56°32′N 42°18′E
- Country: Russia
- Region: Ivanovo Oblast
- District: Yuzhsky District
- Time zone: UTC+3:00

Vzvoz (Russian: Взвоз) is a rural locality (a village) in Yuzhsky District, Ivanovo Oblast, Russia. Population: 36 (2010 census);

== Geography ==
This rural locality is located 19 kilometres (12 mi) from Yuzha (the district's administrative centre), 96 kilometres (60 mi) from Ivanovo (capital of Ivanovo Oblast) and 301 kilometres (187 mi) from Moscow. Oltukhovo is the nearest rural locality.
