= Filippkovo =

Filippkovo Филиппково
- Village
- Location within Ivanovo Oblast Location within Russia
- Coordinates: 57°15′N 40°37′E
- Country: Russia
- Region: Ivanovo Oblast
- District: Komsomolsky District
- Time zone: UTC+3:00

Filippkovo (Russian: Филиппково) is a rural locality (a selo) in Komsomolsky District, Ivanovo Oblast, Russia. Population: 5 (2010 census);

== Geography ==
This rural locality is located 30 kilometres (19 mi) from Komsomolsk (the district's administrative centre), 37 kilometres (23 mi) from Ivanovo (capital of Ivanovo Oblast) and 246 kilometres (153 mi) from Moscow. Sorokhta is the nearest rural locality.
