= Tarantayevo =

Tarantayevo Тарантаево
- Village
- Location within Ivanovo Oblast Location within Russia
- Coordinates: 56°34′N 41°58′E
- Country: Russia
- Region: Ivanovo Oblast
- District: Yuzhsky District
- Time zone: UTC+3:00

Tarantayevo (Russian: Тарантаево) is a rural locality (a village) in Yuzhsky District, Ivanovo Oblast, Russia. Population: 48 (2010 census);

== Geography ==
This rural locality is located 3 kilometres (1.9 mi) from Yuzha (the district's administrative centre), 77 kilometres (48 mi) from Ivanovo (capital of Ivanovo Oblast) and 282 kilometres (175 mi) from Moscow. Rebrovo is the nearest rural locality.
