= Ivankovo, Komsomolsky District, Ivanovo Oblast =

Ivankovo Иваньково
- Village
- Location within Ivanovo Oblast Location within Russia
- Coordinates: 57°03′N 40°26′E
- Country: Russia
- Region: Ivanovo Oblast
- District: Komsomolsky District
- Time zone: UTC+3:00

Ivankovo (Russian: Иваньково) is a rural locality (a village) in Komsomolsky District, Ivanovo Oblast, Russia. Population: 302 (2010 census);

== Geography ==
This rural locality is located 5 kilometres (3.1 mi) from Komsomolsk (the district's administrative centre), 33 kilometres (21 mi) from Ivanovo (capital of Ivanovo Oblast) and 224 kilometres (139 mi) from Moscow. Novoselki is the nearest rural locality.
