= Kruglovo, Yuzhsky District =

Kruglovo Круглово
- Village
- Location within Ivanovo Oblast Location within Russia
- Coordinates: 56°37′N 41°43′E
- Country: Russia
- Region: Ivanovo Oblast
- District: Yuzhsky District
- Time zone: UTC+3:00

Kruglovo (Russian: Круглово) is a rural locality (a village) in Yuzhsky District, Ivanovo Oblast, Russia. Population: 19 (2010 census);

== Geography ==
This rural locality is located 19 kilometres (12 mi) from Yuzha (the district's administrative centre), 61 kilometres (38 mi) from Ivanovo (capital of Ivanovo Oblast) and 269 kilometres (167 mi) from Moscow. Maksimovo is the nearest rural locality.
