= Golokhovo =

Golokhovo Голохово
- Village
- Location within Ivanovo Oblast Location within Russia
- Coordinates: 57°13′N 40°13′E
- Country: Russia
- Region: Ivanovo Oblast
- District: Komsomolsky District
- Time zone: UTC+3:00

Golokhovo (Russian: Голохово) is a rural locality (a village) in Komsomolsky District, Ivanovo Oblast, Russia. Population: 5 (2010 census);

== Geography ==
This rural locality is located 24 kilometres (15 mi) from Komsomolsk (the district's administrative centre), 52 kilometres (32 mi) from Ivanovo (capital of Ivanovo Oblast) and 226 kilometres (140 mi) from Moscow. Petrovskoye is the nearest rural locality.
