= Putilova Gora =

Putilova Gora Путилова Гора
- Village
- Location within Ivanovo Oblast Location within Russia
- Coordinates: 57°10′N 40°35′E
- Country: Russia
- Region: Ivanovo Oblast
- District: Komsomolsky District
- Time zone: UTC+3:00

Putilova Gora (Russian: Путилова Гора) is a rural locality (a village) in Komsomolsky District, Ivanovo Oblast, Russia. Population: 53 (2010 census);

== Geography ==
This rural locality is located 21 kilometres (13 mi) from Komsomolsk (the district's administrative centre), 31 kilometres (19 mi) from Ivanovo (capital of Ivanovo Oblast) and 239 kilometres (149 mi) from Moscow. Nikulino is the nearest rural locality.
