= Yuryevo Pervoye =

Yuryevo Pervoye Юрьево Первое
- Village
- Location within Ivanovo Oblast Location within Russia
- Coordinates: 57°00′N 40°21′E
- Country: Russia
- Region: Ivanovo Oblast
- District: Komsomolsky District
- Time zone: UTC+3:00

Yuryevo Pervoye (Russian: Юрьево Первое) is a rural locality (a village) in Komsomolsky District, Ivanovo Oblast, Russia. Population: 65 (2010 census);

== Geography ==
This rural locality is located 3 kilometres (1.9 mi) from Komsomolsk (the district's administrative centre), 37 kilometres (23 mi) from Ivanovo (capital of Ivanovo Oblast) and 217 kilometres (135 mi) from Moscow. Dubki is the nearest rural locality.
