= Degtyarka, Ivanovo Oblast =

Degtyarka Дегтярька
- Village
- Location within Ivanovo Oblast Location within Russia
- Coordinates: 57°04′N 40°22′E
- Country: Russia
- Region: Ivanovo Oblast
- District: Komsomolsky District
- Time zone: UTC+3:00

Degtyarka (Russian: Дегтярька) is a rural locality (a village) in Komsomolsky District, Ivanovo Oblast, Russia. Population: 8 (2010 census);

== Geography ==
This rural locality is located 6 kilometres (3.7 mi) from Komsomolsk (the district's administrative centre), 37 kilometres (23 mi) from Ivanovo (capital of Ivanovo Oblast) and 222 kilometres (138 mi) from Moscow. Danilovo is the nearest rural locality.
