= Timonovo, Ivanovo Oblast =

Timonovo Тимоново
- Village
- Location within Ivanovo Oblast Location within Russia
- Coordinates: 57°00′N 40°23′E
- Country: Russia
- Region: Ivanovo Oblast
- District: Komsomolsky District
- Time zone: UTC+3:00

Timonovo (Russian: Тимоново) is a rural locality (a village) in Komsomolsky District, Ivanovo Oblast, Russia. Population: 46 (2010 census);

== Geography ==
This rural locality is located 2 kilometres (1.2 mi) from Komsomolsk (the district's administrative centre), 34 kilometres (21 mi) from Ivanovo (capital of Ivanovo Oblast) and 219 kilometres (136 mi) from Moscow. Novaya Usadba is the nearest rural locality.
