= Pogorelka, Yuzhsky District =

Pogorelka Погорелка
- Village
- Location within Ivanovo Oblast Location within Russia
- Coordinates: 56°39′N 41°41′E
- Country: Russia
- Region: Ivanovo Oblast
- District: Yuzhsky District
- Time zone: UTC+3:00

Pogorelka (Russian: Погорелка) is a rural locality (a village) in Yuzhsky District, Ivanovo Oblast, Russia. Population: 23 (2010 census);

== Geography ==
This rural locality is located 22 kilometres (14 mi) from Yuzha (the district's administrative centre), 57 kilometres (35 mi) from Ivanovo (capital of Ivanovo Oblast) and 268 kilometres (167 mi) from Moscow. Kisharikha is the nearest rural locality.
