= Brazino =

Brazino Бразино
- Village
- Location within Ivanovo Oblast Location within Russia
- Coordinates: 57°09′N 40°27′E
- Country: Russia
- Region: Ivanovo Oblast
- District: Komsomolsky District
- Time zone: UTC+3:00

Brazino (Russian: Бразино) is a rural locality (a village) in Komsomolsky District, Ivanovo Oblast, Russia. Population: 9 (2010 census);

== Geography ==
This rural locality is located 16 kilometres (9.9 mi) from Komsomolsk (the district's administrative centre), 36 kilometres (22 mi) from Ivanovo (capital of Ivanovo Oblast) and 232 kilometres (144 mi) from Moscow. Chirikovo is the nearest rural locality.
