= Mikheyevo, Yuzhsky District =

Mikheyevo Михеево
- Village
- Location within Ivanovo Oblast Location within Russia
- Coordinates: 56°33′N 41°43′E
- Country: Russia
- Region: Ivanovo Oblast
- District: Yuzhsky District
- Time zone: UTC+3:00

Mikheyevo (Russian: Михеево) is a rural locality (a village) in Yuzhsky District, Ivanovo Oblast, Russia. Population: 5 (2010 census);

== Geography ==
This rural locality is located 18 kilometres (11 mi) from Yuzha (the district's administrative centre), 67 kilometres (42 mi) from Ivanovo (capital of Ivanovo Oblast) and 267 kilometres (166 mi) from Moscow. Izotino is the nearest rural locality.
