= Spasskoye, Yuzhsky District =

Spasskoye Спасское
- Village
- Location within Ivanovo Oblast Location within Russia
- Coordinates: 56°36′N 41°51′E
- Country: Russia
- Region: Ivanovo Oblast
- District: Yuzhsky District
- Time zone: UTC+3:00

Spasskoye (Russian: Спасское) is a rural locality (a village) in Yuzhsky District, Ivanovo Oblast, Russia. Population: 6 (2010 census);

== Geography ==
This rural locality is located 10 kilometres (6.2 mi) from Yuzha (the district's administrative centre), 69 kilometres (43 mi) from Ivanovo (capital of Ivanovo Oblast) and 277 kilometres (172 mi) from Moscow. Selishchi is the nearest rural locality.
