= Proskovo =

Proskovo Просково
- Village
- Location within Ivanovo Oblast Location within Russia
- Coordinates: 57°02′N 40°15′E
- Country: Russia
- Region: Ivanovo Oblast
- District: Komsomolsky District
- Time zone: UTC+3:00

Proskovo (Russian: Просково) is a rural locality (a village) in Komsomolsky District, Ivanovo Oblast, Russia. Population: 41 (2010 census);

== Geography ==
This rural locality is located 8 kilometres (5.0 mi) from Komsomolsk (the district's administrative centre), 44 kilometres (27 mi) from Ivanovo (capital of Ivanovo Oblast) and 214 kilometres (133 mi) from Moscow. Kochkarovo is the nearest rural locality.
