= Pripekovo =

Pripekovo Припеково
- Village
- Location within Ivanovo Oblast Location within Russia
- Coordinates: 57°09′N 40°34′E
- Country: Russia
- Region: Ivanovo Oblast
- District: Komsomolsky District
- Time zone: UTC+3:00

Pripekovo (Russian: Припеково) is a rural locality (a village) in Komsomolsky District, Ivanovo Oblast, Russia. Population: 26 (2010 census);

== Geography ==
This rural locality is located 18 kilometres (11 mi) from Komsomolsk (the district's administrative centre), 29 kilometres (18 mi) from Ivanovo (capital of Ivanovo Oblast) and 237 kilometres (147 mi) from Moscow. Kozhevnikovo is the nearest rural locality.
