= Lamna Bolshaya =

Lamna Bolshaya Ламна Большая
- Village
- Location within Ivanovo Oblast Location within Russia
- Coordinates: 56°39′N 42°04′E
- Country: Russia
- Region: Ivanovo Oblast
- District: Yuzhsky District
- Time zone: UTC+3:00

Lamna Bolshaya (Russian: Ламна Большая) is a rural locality (a selo) in Yuzhsky District, Ivanovo Oblast, Russia. Population: 6 (2010 census);

== Geography ==
This rural locality is located 9 kilometres (5.6 mi) from Yuzha (the district's administrative centre), 77 kilometres (48 mi) from Ivanovo (capital of Ivanovo Oblast) and 290 kilometres (180 mi) from Moscow. Bykovo is the nearest rural locality.
