= Domnino, Ivanovo Oblast =

Domnino Домнино
- Village
- Location within Ivanovo Oblast Location within Russia
- Coordinates: 56°39′N 41°44′E
- Country: Russia
- Region: Ivanovo Oblast
- District: Yuzhsky District
- Time zone: UTC+3:00

Domnino (Russian: Домнино) is a rural locality (a village) in Yuzhsky District, Ivanovo Oblast, Russia. Population: 90 (2010 census);

== Geography ==
This rural locality is located 19 kilometres (12 mi) from Yuzha (the district's administrative centre), 60 kilometres (37 mi) from Ivanovo (capital of Ivanovo Oblast) and 271 kilometres (168 mi) from Moscow. Kolyagino is the nearest rural locality.
