= Golovets =

Golovets Головец
- Village
- Location within Ivanovo Oblast Location within Russia
- Coordinates: 56°58′N 40°21′E
- Country: Russia
- Region: Ivanovo Oblast
- District: Komsomolsky District
- Time zone: UTC+3:00

Golovets (Russian: Головец) is a rural locality (a village) in Komsomolsky District, Ivanovo Oblast, Russia. Population: 6 (2010 census);

== Geography ==
This rural locality is located 5 kilometres (3.1 mi) from Komsomolsk (the district's administrative centre), 37 kilometres (23 mi) from Ivanovo (capital of Ivanovo Oblast) and 215 kilometres (134 mi) from Moscow. Kholodilovo is the nearest rural locality.
