= Danilovo, Komsomolsky District, Ivanovo Oblast =

Danilovo Данилово
- Village
- Location within Ivanovo Oblast Location within Russia
- Coordinates: 57°04′N 40°21′E
- Country: Russia
- Region: Ivanovo Oblast
- District: Komsomolsky District
- Time zone: UTC+3:00

Danilovo (Russian: Данилово) is a rural locality (a village) in Komsomolsky District, Ivanovo Oblast, Russia. The population was 149 (2010 census);

== Geography ==
This rural locality is located 6 kilometres (3.7 mi) from Komsomolsk (the district's administrative centre), 38 kilometres (24 mi) from Ivanovo (capital of Ivanovo Oblast) and 222 kilometres (138 mi) from Moscow. Degtyarka is the nearest rural locality.
