= Krasnovo, Komsomolsky District, Ivanovo Oblast =

Krasnovo Красново
- Village
- Location within Ivanovo Oblast Location within Russia
- Coordinates: 57°11′N 40°26′E
- Country: Russia
- Region: Ivanovo Oblast
- District: Komsomolsky District
- Time zone: UTC+3:00

Krasnovo (Russian: Красново) is a rural locality (a village) in Komsomolsky District, Ivanovo Oblast, Russia. Population: 5 (2010 census);

== Geography ==
This rural locality is located 19 kilometres (12 mi) from Komsomolsk (the district's administrative centre), 39 kilometres (24 mi) from Ivanovo (capital of Ivanovo Oblast) and 234 kilometres (145 mi) from Moscow. Svatkovo is the nearest rural locality.
