= Soino =

Soino Соино
- Village
- Location within Ivanovo Oblast Location within Russia
- Coordinates: 56°35′N 41°55′E
- Country: Russia
- Region: Ivanovo Oblast
- District: Yuzhsky District
- Time zone: UTC+3:00

Soino (Russian: Соино) is a rural locality (a village) in Yuzhsky District, Ivanovo Oblast, Russia. Population: 28 (2010 census);

== Geography ==
This rural locality is located 5 kilometres (3.1 mi) from Yuzha (the district's administrative centre), 74 kilometres (46 mi) from Ivanovo (capital of Ivanovo Oblast) and 279 kilometres (173 mi) from Moscow. Rusino is the nearest rural locality.
