= Mytishchi (inhabited locality) =

Mytishchi (Russian: Мытищи) is the name of several inhabited localities in Russia.

Urban localities

- Mytishchi, a city in Mytishchinsky District of Moscow Oblast

Rural localities

- Mytishchi, Gavrilovo-Posadsky District, Ivanovo Oblast, a village in Gavrilovo-Posadsky District, Ivanovo Oblast
- Mytishchi, Komsomolsky District, Ivanovo Oblast, a selo in Komsomolsky District, Ivanovo Oblast
- Mytishchi, Kostroma Oblast, a village in Nezhitinskoye Settlement of Makaryevsky District of Kostroma Oblast
- Mytishchi, Yaroslavl Oblast, a village in Bolsheselsky Rural Okrug of Bolsheselsky District of Yaroslavl Oblast
