= Kozhevnikovo, Komsomolsky District, Ivanovo Oblast =

Kozhevnikovo Кожевниково
- Village
- Location within Ivanovo Oblast Location within Russia
- Coordinates: 57°09′N 40°34′E
- Country: Russia
- Region: Ivanovo Oblast
- District: Komsomolsky District
- Time zone: UTC+3:00

Kozhevnikovo (Russian: Кожевниково) is a rural locality (a village) in Komsomolsky District, Ivanovo Oblast, Russia. Population: 13 (2010 census);

== Geography ==
This rural locality is located 19 kilometres (12 mi) from Komsomolsk (the district's administrative centre), 30 kilometres (19 mi) from Ivanovo (capital of Ivanovo Oblast) and 237 kilometres (147 mi) from Moscow. Pripekovo is the nearest rural locality.
