= Starovo, Komsomolsky District, Ivanovo Oblast =

Starovo Старово
- Village
- Location within Ivanovo Oblast Location within Russia
- Coordinates: 57°05′N 40°14′E
- Country: Russia
- Region: Ivanovo Oblast
- District: Komsomolsky District
- Time zone: UTC+3:00

Starovo (Russian: Старово) is a rural locality (a village) in Komsomolsky District, Ivanovo Oblast, Russia. Population: 22 (2010 census);

== Geography ==
This rural locality is located 11 kilometres (6.8 mi) from Komsomolsk (the district's administrative centre), 45 kilometres (28 mi) from Ivanovo (capital of Ivanovo Oblast) and 217 kilometres (135 mi) from Moscow. Mytishchi is the nearest rural locality.
