= Mosta, Ivanovo Oblast =

Mosta Моста
- Village
- Location within Ivanovo Oblast Location within Russia
- Coordinates: 56°31′N 42°09′E
- Country: Russia
- Region: Ivanovo Oblast
- District: Yuzhsky District
- Time zone: UTC+3:00

Mosta (Russian: Моста) is a rural locality (a village) in Yuzhsky District, Ivanovo Oblast, Russia. Population: 643 (2010 census);

== Geography ==
This rural locality is located 11 kilometres (6.8 mi) from Yuzha (the district's administrative centre), 89 kilometres (55 mi) from Ivanovo (capital of Ivanovo Oblast) and 292 kilometres (181 mi) from Moscow. Cheusovo is the nearest rural locality.
