= Khotiml =

Khotiml Хотимль
- Village
- Location within Ivanovo Oblast Location within Russia
- Coordinates: 56°39′N 41°42′E
- Country: Russia
- Region: Ivanovo Oblast
- District: Yuzhsky District
- Time zone: UTC+3:00

Khotiml (Russian: Хотимль) is a rural locality (a selo) in Yuzhsky District, Ivanovo Oblast, Russia. Population: 245 (2010 census);

== Geography ==
This rural locality is located 20 kilometres (12 mi) from Yuzha (the district's administrative centre), 59 kilometres (37 mi) from Ivanovo (capital of Ivanovo Oblast) and 269 kilometres (167 mi) from Moscow. Kisharikha is the nearest rural locality.
