= Kuleberyevo =

Kuleberyevo Кулеберьево
- Village
- Location within Ivanovo Oblast Location within Russia
- Coordinates: 56°58′N 40°30′E
- Country: Russia
- Region: Ivanovo Oblast
- District: Komsomolsky District
- Time zone: UTC+3:00

Kuleberyevo (Russian: Кулеберьево) is a rural locality (a selo) in Komsomolsky District, Ivanovo Oblast, Russia. Population: 150 (2010 census);

== Geography ==
This rural locality is located 10 kilometres (6.2 mi) from Komsomolsk (the district's administrative centre), 28 kilometres (17 mi) from Ivanovo (capital of Ivanovo Oblast) and 222 kilometres (138 mi) from Moscow. Vorontsovo is the nearest rural locality.
