= Nikulino, Komsomolsky District, Ivanovo Oblast =

Nikulino Никулино
- Village
- Location within Ivanovo Oblast Location within Russia
- Coordinates: 57°10′N 40°34′E
- Country: Russia
- Region: Ivanovo Oblast
- District: Komsomolsky District
- Time zone: UTC+3:00

Nikulino (Russian: Никулино) is a rural locality (a village) in Komsomolsky District, Ivanovo Oblast, Russia. Population: 19 (2010 census);

== Geography ==
This rural locality is located 20 kilometres (12 mi) from Komsomolsk (the district's administrative centre), 31 kilometres (19 mi) from Ivanovo (capital of Ivanovo Oblast) and 238 kilometres (148 mi) from Moscow. Kozhevnikovo is the nearest rural locality.
