= Lukino, Yuzhsky District =

Lukino Лукино
- Village
- Location within Ivanovo Oblast Location within Russia
- Coordinates: 56°34′N 42°16′E
- Country: Russia
- Region: Ivanovo Oblast
- District: Yuzhsky District
- Time zone: UTC+3:00

Lukino (Russian: Лукино) is a rural locality (a village) in Yuzhsky District, Ivanovo Oblast, Russia. Population: 38 (2010 census);

== Geography ==
This rural locality is located 16 kilometres (9.9 mi) from Yuzha (the district's administrative centre), 92 kilometres (57 mi) from Ivanovo (capital of Ivanovo Oblast) and 299 kilometres (186 mi) from Moscow. Kochergino is the nearest rural locality.
