= Novaya Usadba =

Novaya Usadba Новая Усадьба
- Village
- Location within Ivanovo Oblast Location within Russia
- Coordinates: 57°01′N 40°22′E
- Country: Russia
- Region: Ivanovo Oblast
- District: Komsomolsky District
- Time zone: UTC+3:00

Novaya Usadba (Russian: Новая Усадьба) is a rural locality (a selo) in Komsomolsky District, Ivanovo Oblast, Russia. Population: 255 (2010 census);

== Geography ==
This rural locality is located 1 kilometre (0.62 mi) from Komsomolsk (the district's administrative centre), 36 kilometres (22 mi) from Ivanovo (capital of Ivanovo Oblast) and 218 kilometres (135 mi) from Moscow. Yablonovo is the nearest rural locality.
