= Rusino, Yuzhsky District =

Rusino Русино
- Village
- Location within Ivanovo Oblast Location within Russia
- Coordinates: 56°35′N 41°54′E
- Country: Russia
- Region: Ivanovo Oblast
- District: Yuzhsky District
- Time zone: UTC+3:00

Rusino (Russian: Русино) is a rural locality (a village) in Yuzhsky District, Ivanovo Oblast, Russia. Population: 53 (2010 census);

== Geography ==
This rural locality is located 6 kilometres (3.7 mi) from Yuzha (the district's administrative centre), 74 kilometres (46 mi) from Ivanovo (capital of Ivanovo Oblast) and 279 kilometres (173 mi) from Moscow. Soino is the nearest rural locality.
