= Pustyn, Yuzhsky District =

Pustyn Пустынь
- Village
- Location within Ivanovo Oblast Location within Russia
- Coordinates: 56°26′N 41°59′E
- Country: Russia
- Region: Ivanovo Oblast
- District: Yuzhsky District
- Time zone: UTC+3:00

Pustyn (Russian: Пустынь) is a rural locality (a village) in Yuzhsky District, Ivanovo Oblast, Russia. Population: 59 (2010 census);

== Geography ==
This rural locality is located 15 kilometres (9.3 mi) from Yuzha (the district's administrative centre), 88 kilometres (55 mi) from Ivanovo (capital of Ivanovo Oblast) and 279 kilometres (173 mi) from Moscow. Novoklyazminskoye is the nearest rural locality.
