= Chernyatino, Ivanovo Oblast =

Chernyatino Чернятино
- Village
- Location within Ivanovo Oblast Location within Russia
- Coordinates: 57°12′N 40°20′E
- Country: Russia
- Region: Ivanovo Oblast
- District: Komsomolsky District
- Time zone: UTC+3:00

Chernyatino (Russian: Чернятино) is a rural locality (a village) in Komsomolsky District, Ivanovo Oblast, Russia. Population: 7 (2010 census);

== Geography ==
This rural locality is located 20 kilometres (12 mi) from Komsomolsk (the district's administrative centre), 45 kilometres (28 mi) from Ivanovo (capital of Ivanovo Oblast) and 230 kilometres (140 mi) from Moscow. Koromyslovo is the nearest rural locality.
