= Sorokhta =

Sorokhta Сорохта
- Village
- Location within Ivanovo Oblast Location within Russia
- Coordinates: 57°14′N 40°37′E
- Country: Russia
- Region: Ivanovo Oblast
- District: Komsomolsky District
- Time zone: UTC+3:00

Sorokhta (Russian: Сорохта) is a rural locality (a selo) in Komsomolsky District, Ivanovo Oblast, Russia. Population: 80 (2010 census);

== Geography ==
This rural locality is located 28 kilometres (17 mi) from Komsomolsk (the district's administrative centre), 34 kilometres (21 mi) from Ivanovo (capital of Ivanovo Oblast) and 245 kilometres (152 mi) from Moscow. Filippkovo is the nearest rural locality.
