= Travino, Ivanovo Oblast =

Travino Травино
- Village
- Location within Ivanovo Oblast Location within Russia
- Coordinates: 56°40′N 41°46′E
- Country: Russia
- Region: Ivanovo Oblast
- District: Yuzhsky District
- Time zone: UTC+3:00

Travino (Russian: Травино) is a rural locality (a village) in Yuzhsky District, Ivanovo Oblast, Russia. Population: 44 (2010 census);

== Geography ==
This rural locality is located 18 kilometres (11 mi) from Yuzha (the district's administrative centre), 61 kilometres (38 mi) from Ivanovo (capital of Ivanovo Oblast) and 274 kilometres (170 mi) from Moscow. Kolyagino is the nearest rural locality.
