= Kisharikha =

Kisharikha Кишариха
- Village
- Location within Ivanovo Oblast Location within Russia
- Coordinates: 56°39′N 41°41′E
- Country: Russia
- Region: Ivanovo Oblast
- District: Yuzhsky District
- Time zone: UTC+3:00

Kisharikha (Russian: Кишариха) is a rural locality (a village) in Yuzhsky District, Ivanovo Oblast, Russia. Population: 19 (2010 census);

== Geography ==
This rural locality is located 21 kilometres (13 mi) from Yuzha (the district's administrative centre), 58 kilometres (36 mi) from Ivanovo (capital of Ivanovo Oblast) and 268 kilometres (167 mi) from Moscow. Pogorelka is the nearest rural locality.
