= Yemelyanovo, Yuzhsky District =

Yemelyanovo Емельяново
- Village
- Location within Ivanovo Oblast Location within Russia
- Coordinates: 56°38′N 41°43′E
- Country: Russia
- Region: Ivanovo Oblast
- District: Yuzhsky District
- Time zone: UTC+3:00

Yemelyanovo (Russian: Емельяново) is a rural locality (a village) in Yuzhsky District, Ivanovo Oblast, Russia. Population: 122 (2010 census);

== Geography ==
This rural locality is located 19 kilometres (12 mi) from Yuzha (the district's administrative centre), 61 kilometres (38 mi) from Ivanovo (capital of Ivanovo Oblast) and 270 kilometres (170 mi) from Moscow. Khotiml is the nearest rural locality.
