= Svatkovo, Ivanovo Oblast =

Svatkovo Сватково
- Village
- Location within Ivanovo Oblast Location within Russia
- Coordinates: 57°11′N 40°25′E
- Country: Russia
- Region: Ivanovo Oblast
- District: Komsomolsky District
- Time zone: UTC+3:00

Svatkovo (Russian: Сватково) is a rural locality (a village) in Komsomolsky District, Ivanovo Oblast, Russia. Population: 6 (2010 census);

== Geography ==
This rural locality is located 19 kilometres (12 mi) from Komsomolsk (the district's administrative centre), 40 kilometres (25 mi) from Ivanovo (capital of Ivanovo Oblast) and 233 kilometres (145 mi) from Moscow. Krasnovo is the nearest rural locality.
