= Manshino, Ivanovo Oblast =

Manshino Маньшино
- Village
- Location within Ivanovo Oblast Location within Russia
- Coordinates: 56°33′N 41°40′E
- Country: Russia
- Region: Ivanovo Oblast
- District: Yuzhsky District
- Time zone: UTC+3:00

Manshino (Russian: Маньшино) is a rural locality (a village) in Yuzhsky District, Ivanovo Oblast, Russia. Population: 6 (2010 census);

== Geography ==
This rural locality is located 21 kilometres (13 mi) from Yuzha (the district's administrative centre), 65 kilometres (40 mi) from Ivanovo (capital of Ivanovo Oblast) and 264 kilometres (164 mi) from Moscow. Churakovo is the nearest rural locality.
