= Tarasikha, Yuzhsky District =

Tarasikha Тарасиха
- Village
- Location within Ivanovo Oblast Location within Russia
- Coordinates: 56°42′N 42°06′E
- Country: Russia
- Region: Ivanovo Oblast
- District: Yuzhsky District
- Time zone: UTC+3:00

Tarasikha (Russian: Тарасиха) is a rural locality (a village) in Yuzhsky District, Ivanovo Oblast, Russia. Population: 21 (2010 census);

== Geography ==
This rural locality is located 16 kilometres (9.9 mi) from Yuzha (the district's administrative centre), 77 kilometres (48 mi) from Ivanovo (capital of Ivanovo Oblast) and 294 kilometres (183 mi) from Moscow. Zykovo is the nearest rural locality.
