= Nikulikha =

Nikulikha Никулиха
- Village
- Location within Ivanovo Oblast Location within Russia
- Coordinates: 56°27′N 41°57′E
- Country: Russia
- Region: Ivanovo Oblast
- District: Yuzhsky District
- Time zone: UTC+3:00

Nikulikha (Russian: Никулиха) is a rural locality (a village) in Yuzhsky District, Ivanovo Oblast, Russia. Population: 7 (2010 census);

== Geography ==
This rural locality is located 14 kilometres (8.7 mi) from Yuzha (the district's administrative centre), 85 kilometres (53 mi) from Ivanovo (capital of Ivanovo Oblast) and 278 kilometres (173 mi) from Moscow. Glushitsy is the nearest rural locality.
