= Tomarovo =

Tomarovo Томарово
- Village
- Location within Ivanovo Oblast Location within Russia
- Coordinates: 56°58′N 40°28′E
- Country: Russia
- Region: Ivanovo Oblast
- District: Komsomolsky District
- Time zone: UTC+3:00

Tomarovo (Russian: Томарово) is a rural locality (a village) in Komsomolsky District, Ivanovo Oblast, Russia. Population: 9 (2010 census);

== Geography ==
This rural locality is located 8 kilometres (5.0 mi) from Komsomolsk (the district's administrative centre), 30 kilometres (19 mi) from Ivanovo (capital of Ivanovo Oblast) and 220 kilometres (140 mi) from Moscow. Kuleberyevo is the nearest rural locality.
