= Kitaynovo =

Kitaynovo Китайново
- Village
- Location within Ivanovo Oblast Location within Russia
- Coordinates: 56°36′N 42°15′E
- Country: Russia
- Region: Ivanovo Oblast
- District: Yuzhsky District
- Time zone: UTC+3:00

Kitaynovo (Russian: Китайново) is a rural locality (a village) in Yuzhsky District, Ivanovo Oblast, Russia. Population: 8 (2010 census);

== Geography ==
This rural locality is located 15 kilometres (9.3 mi) from Yuzha (the district's administrative centre), 90 kilometres (56 mi) from Ivanovo (capital of Ivanovo Oblast) and 299 kilometres (186 mi) from Moscow. Kochergino is the nearest rural locality.
