= Selishchi, Yuzhsky District =

Selishchi Селищи
- Village
- Location within Ivanovo Oblast Location within Russia
- Coordinates: 56°36′N 42°50′E
- Country: Russia
- Region: Ivanovo Oblast
- District: Yuzhsky District
- Time zone: UTC+3:00

Selishchi (Russian: Селищи) is a rural locality (a village) in Yuzhsky District, Ivanovo Oblast, Russia. Population: 184 (2010 census);

== Geography ==
This rural locality is located 11 kilometres (6.8 mi) from Yuzha (the district's administrative centre), 69 kilometres (43 mi) from Ivanovo (capital of Ivanovo Oblast) and 275 kilometres (171 mi) from Moscow. Spasskoye is the nearest rural locality.
