= Stanovoye, Komsomolsky District, Ivanovo Oblast =

Stanovoye Становое
- Village
- Location within Ivanovo Oblast Location within Russia
- Coordinates: 57°13′N 40°15′E
- Country: Russia
- Region: Ivanovo Oblast
- District: Komsomolsky District
- Time zone: UTC+3:00

Stanovoye (Russian: Становое) is a rural locality (a village) in Komsomolsky District, Ivanovo Oblast, Russia. Population: 8 (2010 census);

== Geography ==
This rural locality is located 24 kilometres (15 mi) from Komsomolsk (the district's administrative centre), 50 kilometres (31 mi) from Ivanovo (capital of Ivanovo Oblast) and 228 kilometres (142 mi) from Moscow. Tyugayevo is the nearest rural locality.
