= Nerl =

Nerl or NERL may refer to:

- Nerl (urban-type settlement), a settlement in Ivanovo Oblast, Russia
- Nerl (Klyazma), a river in the Yaroslavl, Ivanovo, and Vladimir Oblasts, tributary of the Klyazma
- Nerl (Volga), a river in the Yaroslavl and Tver Oblasts, tributary of the Volga
- National Equal Rights League, oldest American organization dedicated to black liberation
- National Exposure Research Laboratory, a division of the United States Environmental Protection Agency
- Newark-Elizabeth Rail Link, a light rail line proposed in the American state of New Jersey
- NorthEast Research Libraries Consortium, see Center for Research Libraries
