= Mytishchi, Komsomolsky District, Ivanovo Oblast =

Mytishchi Мытищи
- Village
- Location within Ivanovo Oblast Location within Russia
- Coordinates: 57°05′N 40°13′E
- Country: Russia
- Region: Ivanovo Oblast
- District: Komsomolsky District
- Time zone: UTC+3:00

Mytishchi (Russian: Мытищи) is a rural locality (a selo) in Komsomolsky District, Ivanovo Oblast, Russia. Population: 148 (2010 census);

== Geography ==
This rural locality is located 11 kilometres (6.8 mi) from Komsomolsk (the district's administrative centre), 46 kilometres (29 mi) from Ivanovo (capital of Ivanovo Oblast) and 216 kilometres (134 mi) from Moscow. Slobodka is the nearest rural locality.
