= Kibergino =

Kibergino Кибергино
- Work settlement
- Interactive map of Kibergino
- Location of Kibergino Kibergino (Ivanovo Oblast)
- Coordinates: 56°38′32″N 40°21′19″E
- Country: Russia
- Federal subject: Ivanovo Oblast
- Administrative district: Teykovsky District

Government
  - The Head of the settlement: Krasnov V.Y.

Population (2010 Census)
  - Total: 292
  - Estimate (2010): 292 (0%)

Administrative status
  - Capital of: Lukhsky District

Municipal status
  - Municipal district: Teykovsky Municipal District
  - Urban settlement: Nerlian Urban Settlement
  - Capital of: Teykovsky Municipal District, Nerlian Urban Settlement
- Time zone: UTC+3 (MSK)
- Postal code: 155030
- OKTMO ID: 24629154116
- Website: нерль-адм.рф

Kibergino - is a village in Russia, Ivanovo Oblast, Teykovsky District, Nerlian urban settlement.

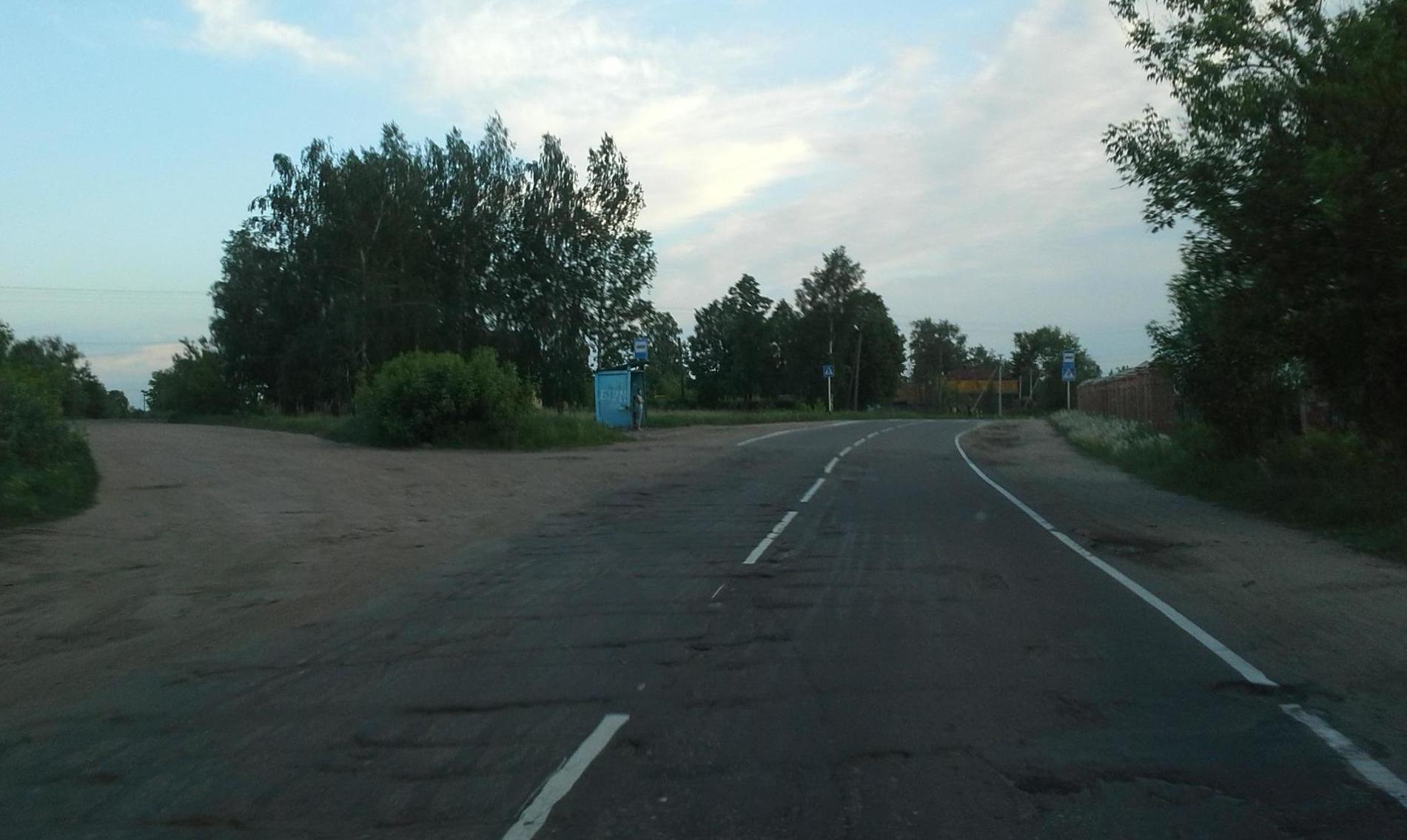
Centralnaya street
