= Stanovlyansky District =

Stanovlyansky District Становлянский район (Russian)
- District
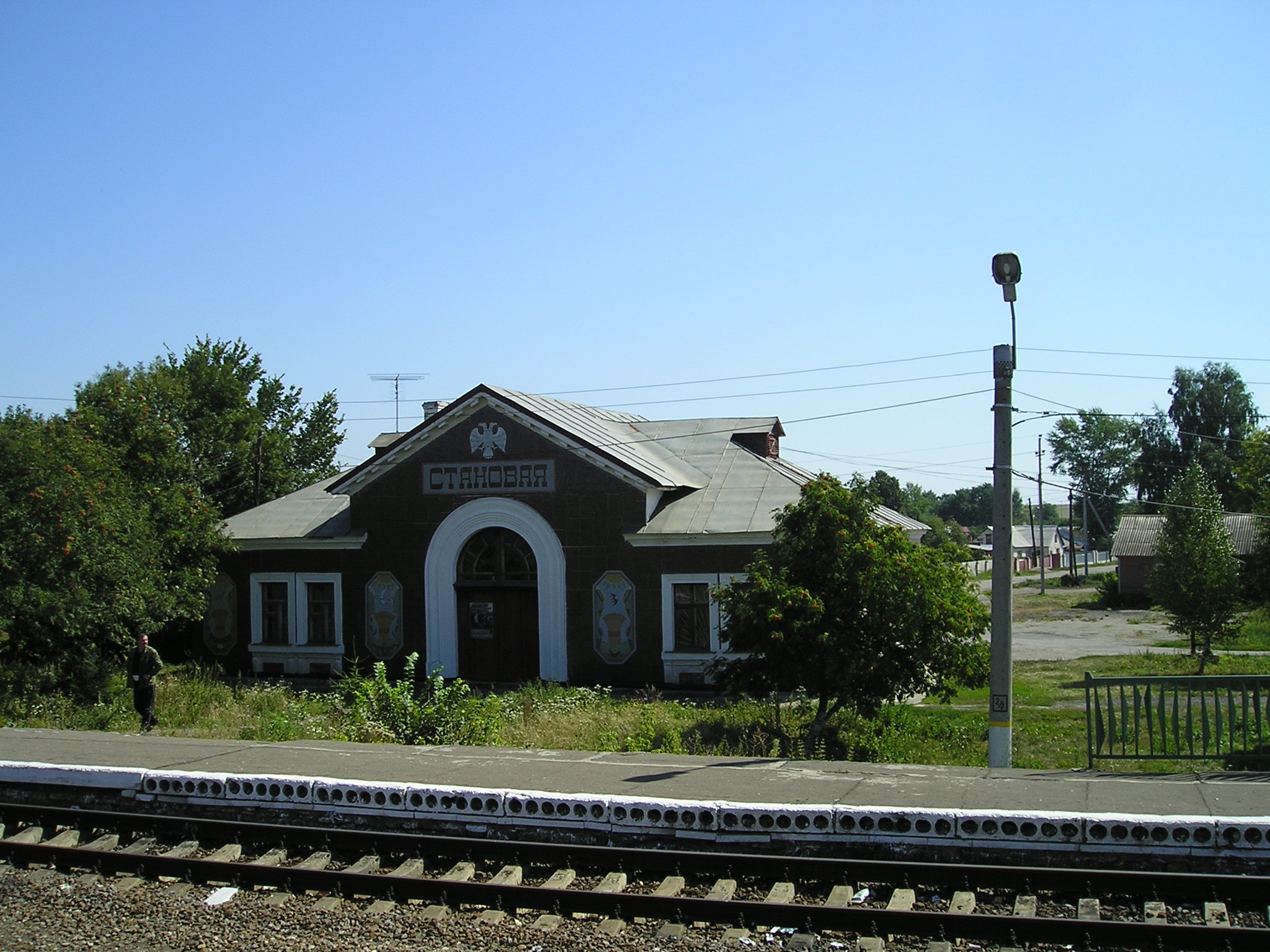
- Train station, Stanovlyansky District

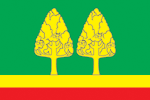
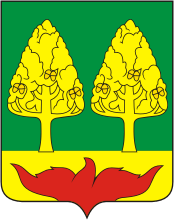
- Flag Coat of arms
- Location of Stanovlyansky District in Lipetsk Oblast
- Coordinates: 52°45′57″N 38°20′47″E
- Country: Russia
- Federal subject: Lipetsk Oblast
- Established: 30 July 1928
- Administrative center: Stanovoye

Area
  - Total: 1,350 km^{2} (520 sq mi)

Population (2010 Census)
  - Total: 18,746
  - Density: 13.9/km^{2} (36.0/sq mi)
  - Urban: 0%
  - Rural: 100%

Administrative structure
  - Administrative divisions: 18 selsoviet
  - Inhabited localities: 121 rural localities

Municipal structure
  - Municipally incorporated as: Stanovlyansky Municipal District
  - Municipal divisions: 0 urban settlements, 18 rural settlements
- Time zone: UTC+3 (MSK)
- OKTMO ID: 42642000
- Website: http://adminstanovoe.ru/

Stanovlyansky District (Russian: Становля́нский райо́н) is an administrative and municipal district (raion), one of the eighteen in Lipetsk Oblast, Russia. It is located in the northwest of the oblast. The area of the district is 1,350 square kilometers (520 sq mi). Its administrative center is the rural locality (a selo) of Stanovoye. Population: 16,702 (2021 census); 18,746 (2010 census); 20,424 (2002 Census); 21,650 (1989 Soviet census). The population of Stanovoye accounts for 30.2% of the district's total population.
