= Petrovsky, Ivanovo Oblast =

Petrovsky Петровский
- Urban-type settlement
- Interactive map of Petrovsky
- Location of Petrovsky Petrovsky (Ivanovo Oblast)
- Coordinates: 56.6439°N 40.3137°E
- Country: Russia
- Federal subject: Ivanovo Oblast
- Administrative district: Gavrilovo-Posadsky District

Population (2010 Census)
  - Total: 2,558
  - Estimate (2025): 1,814 (−29.1%)
- Time zone: UTC+3 (MSK)
- Postal code: 155020
- OKTMO ID: 24603156051

Petrovsky (Russian: Петро́вский) is an urban locality (an urban-type settlement) in Gavrilovo-Posadsky District of Ivanovo Oblast, Russia. Population: 1,883 (2021 census); 2,558 (2010 census); 3,047 (2002 census); 3,672 (1989 Soviet census).
