= Stanovoye, Lipetsk Oblast =

Rural locality in Lipetsk Oblast, Russia

Stanovoye Становое
- Selo
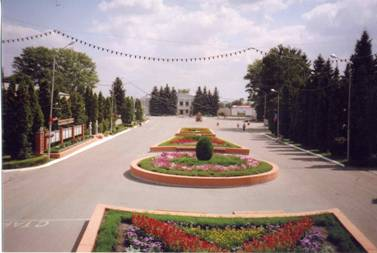
- Interactive map of Stanovoye
- Location of Stanovoye Stanovoye (Lipetsk Oblast)
- Coordinates: 52°45′27″N 38°19′24″E
- Country: Russia
- Federal subject: Lipetsk Oblast
- Administrative district: Stanovlyansky District
- First mentioned: 1620
- Rural locality status since: 1778

Population
  - Estimate (2021): 5,046 )

Administrative status
  - Capital of: Stanovlyansky District

Municipal status
  - Municipal district: Stanovlyansky Municipal District
  - Rural settlement: Stanovlyansky
- Time zone: UTC+3 (MSK)
- Postal code: 238725
- OKTMO ID: 42642452101

Stanovoye (Russian: Становое) is a rural locality (a selo) and the administrative center of Stanovlyansky District, Lipetsk Oblast, Russia. Population: 5,046 (2021 census); 5,252 (2010 census); 5,258 (2002 census); 4,966 (1989 Soviet census).
