= Stanovaya, Vologda Oblast =

Stanovaya Становая
- Village
- Location within Vologda Oblast Location within Russia
- Coordinates: 60°29′N 37°55′E
- Country: Russia
- Region: Vologda Oblast
- District: Vashkinsky District
- Time zone: UTC+3:00

Stanovaya (Russian: Становая) is a rural locality (a village) in Andreyevskoye Rural Settlement, Vashkinsky District, Vologda Oblast, Russia. The population was 12 as of 2002.

== Geography ==
Stanovaya is located 28 km north of Lipin Bor (the district's administrative centre) by road. Andreyevskaya is the nearest rural locality.
