= Kolobovo =

Kolobovo Колобово
- Urban-type settlement
- Interactive map of Kolobovo
- Location of Kolobovo Kolobovo (Ivanovo Oblast)
- Coordinates: 56.7055°N 41.3406°E
- Country: Russia
- Federal subject: Ivanovo Oblast
- Administrative district: Shuysky District

Population (2010 Census)
  - Total: 2,451
  - Estimate (2025): 2,266 (−7.5%)
- Time zone: UTC+3 (MSK)
- Postal code: 155933
- OKTMO ID: 24633154051

Kolobovo (Russian: Ко́лобово) is an urban locality (an urban-type settlement) in Shuysky District of Ivanovo Oblast, Russia. Population: 2,387 (2021 census); 2,451 (2010 census); 3,013 (2002 census); 3,176 (1989 Soviet census).
