= Arkhipovka =

Arkhipovka Архиповка
- Selo
- Location within Voronezh Oblast Location within Russia
- Coordinates: 50°12′N 39°25′E
- Country: Russia
- Region: Voronezh Oblast
- District: Rossoshansky District
- Time zone: UTC+3:00

Arkhipovka (Russian: Архиповка) is a rural locality (a selo) and the administrative center of Arkhipovskoye Rural Settlement, Rossoshansky District, Voronezh Oblast, Russia. The population was 1,336 as of 2010. There are 12 streets.

== Geography ==
Arkhipovka is located 13 km northwest of Rossosh (the district's administrative centre) by road. Posyolok sovkhoza Rossoshansky is the nearest rural locality.
