= Ivanovsky District, Ivanovo Oblast =

Ivanovsky District Ивановский район (Russian)
- District
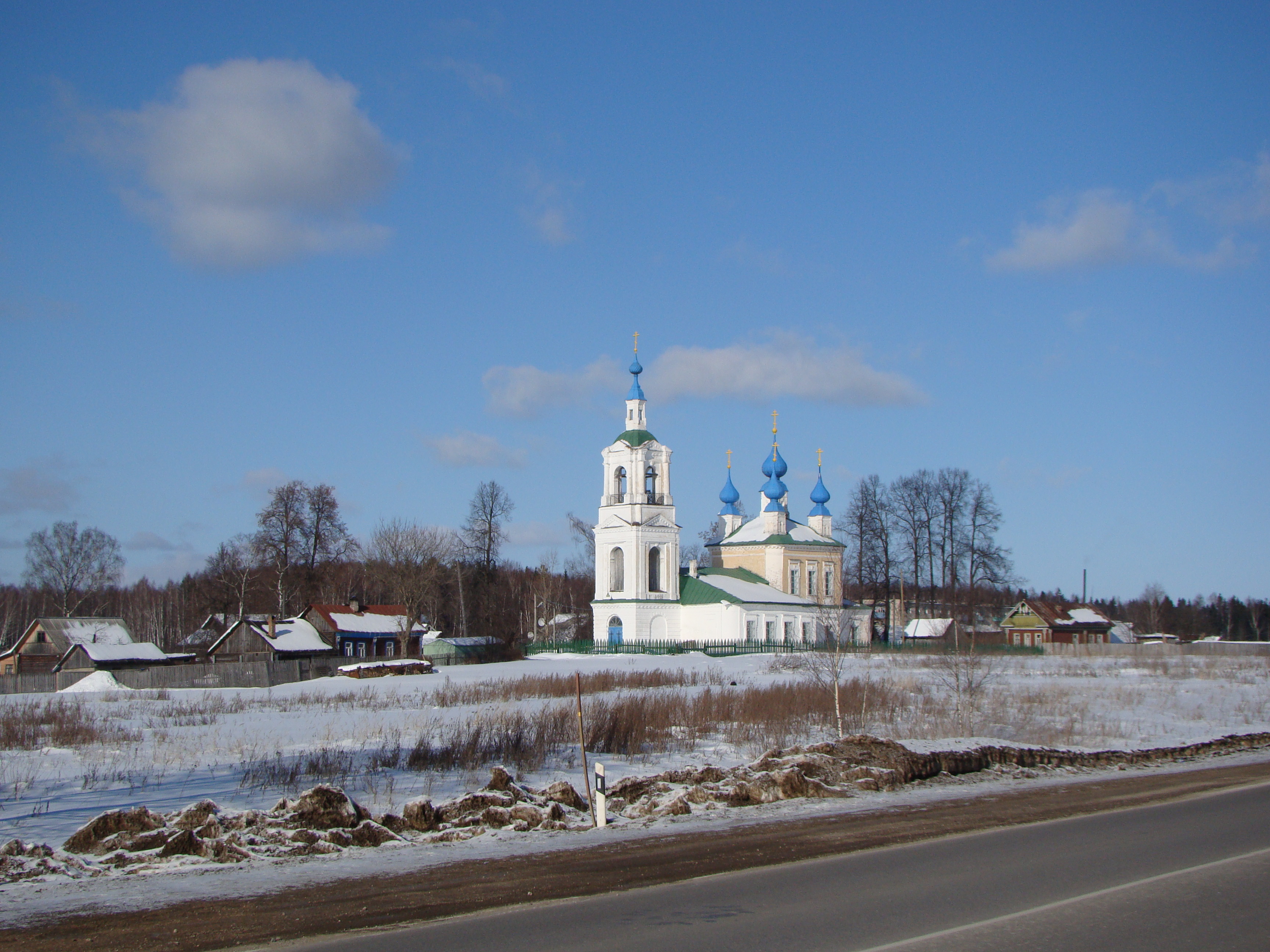
- Elijah church-Bibirevo-Ivanovo, Ivanovsky District

- Flag Coat of arms
- Location of Ivanovsky District in Ivanovo Oblast
- Coordinates: 57°00′N 40°59′E
- Country: Russia
- Federal subject: Ivanovo Oblast
- Administrative center: Ivanovo

Area
  - Total: 1,092 km^{2} (422 sq mi)

Population (2010 Census)
  - Total: 66,398
  - Density: 60.80/km^{2} (157.5/sq mi)
  - Urban: 44.3%
  - Rural: 55.7%

Administrative structure
  - Inhabited localities: 204 rural localities

Municipal structure
  - Municipally incorporated as: Ivanovsky Municipal District
  - Municipal divisions: 0 urban settlements, 11 rural settlements
- Time zone: UTC+3 (MSK)
- OKTMO ID: 24607000
- Website: http://ivrayon.ru/

Ivanovsky District (Russian: Ива́новский райо́н) is an administrative and municipal district (raion), one of the twenty-one in Ivanovo Oblast, Russia. It is located in the center of the oblast. The area of the district is 1,092 square kilometers (422 sq mi). Its administrative center is the city of Ivanovo (which is not administratively a part of the district). Population: 40,509 (2021 census); 66,398 (2010 census); 64,270 (2002 Census); 61,868 (1989 Soviet census).

== Administrative and municipal status ==
Within the framework of administrative divisions, Ivanovsky District is one of the twenty-one in the oblast. The city of Ivanovo serves as its administrative center, despite being incorporated separately as an administrative unit with the status equal to that of the districts.

As a municipal division, the district is incorporated as Ivanovsky Municipal District. The City of Ivanovo is incorporated separately from the district as Ivanovo Urban Okrug.
