= Novopistsovo =

Urban locality in Ivanovo Oblast, Russia

Novopistsovo Новописцово
- Urban-type settlement
- Interactive map of Novopistsovo
- Location of Novopistsovo Novopistsovo (Ivanovo Oblast)
- Coordinates: 57°19′20″N 41°50′18″E
- Country: Russia
- Federal subject: Ivanovo Oblast
- Administrative district: Vichugsky District

Population (2010 Census)
  - Total: 2,748
  - Estimate (2025): 2,175 (−20.9%)
- Time zone: UTC+3 (MSK)
- Postal code: 155313
- OKTMO ID: 24601157051

Novopistsovo (Russian: Новописцово) is an urban-type settlement in Vichugsky District, Ivanovo Oblast, Russia. Population: 2,322 (2021 census); 2,748 (2010 census); 3,172 (2002 census); 3,718 (1989 Soviet census).
