= Kamenka, Ivanovo Oblast =

Urban locality in Ivanovo Oblast, Russia

Kamenka Каменка
- Urban-type settlement
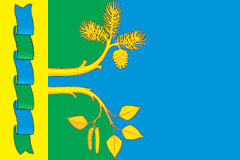
- Flag
- Interactive map of Kamenka
- Location of Kamenka Kamenka (Ivanovo Oblast)
- Coordinates: 57°23′29″N 41°47′46″E
- Country: Russia
- Federal subject: Ivanovo Oblast
- Administrative district: Vichugsky District

Population (2010 Census)
  - Total: 3,981
  - Estimate (2025): 3,478 (−12.6%)
- Time zone: UTC+3 (MSK)
- Postal code: 155315
- OKTMO ID: 24601154051

Kamenka (Russian: Каменка) is an urban-type settlement in Vichugsky District, Ivanovo Oblast, Russia. Population: 3,689 (2021 census); 3,981 (2010 census); 4,269 (2002 census); 4,333 (1989 Soviet census).
