= Nerl (urban-type settlement) =

Nerl Нерль
- Work settlement
- Location of Nerl
- Location of Nerl Nerl (Ivanovo Oblast)
- Coordinates: 56°39′N 40°23′E
- Country: Russia
- Federal subject: Ivanovo Oblast
- Administrative district: Teykovsky District

Government
  - The Head of the settlement: Krasnov V.Y.

Population (2010 Census)
  - Total: 2,052

Administrative status
  - Capital of: Lukhsky District

Municipal status
  - Municipal district: Teykovsky Municipal District
  - Urban settlement: Nerlian Urban Settlement
  - Capital of: Teykovsky Municipal District, Nerlian Urban Settlement
- Time zone: UTC+3 (MSK)
- Postal code(s): 155030
- OKTMO ID: 24629154051
- Website: нерль-адм.рф

Nerl is an urban-type settlement (township) (since 1927) in Russia, Ivanovo Oblast, Teykovsky District, the administrative center of Nerlian urban settlement. Population: 2,016 (2021 Census); 2,052 (2010 Census); 2,373 (2002 Census); 3,194 (1989 Soviet census).

== Geography ==
Nerl is situated in 62 km to the south-west from Ivanovo. It has a railway station on the line Ivanovo – Aleksandrov. The village of Kibergino is within the settlement.

== Economics ==
The main factory of the settlement is a weaving factory, also some wood-working factories are situated here.

== Culture ==
There is a culture house in the settlement.

== People are related to the settlement ==
Tatyana Yakovleva – the congresswoman of the state Duma of the Russian Federation.
