= Staraya Vichuga =

Urban locality in Ivanovo Oblast, Russia

Staraya Vichuga Старая Вичуга
- Urban-type settlement
- Interactive map of Staraya Vichuga
- Location of Staraya Vichuga Staraya Vichuga (Ivanovo Oblast)
- Coordinates: 57°16′04″N 41°52′38″E
- Country: Russia
- Federal subject: Ivanovo Oblast
- Administrative district: Vichugsky District

Population (2010 Census)
  - Total: 5,325
  - Estimate (2025): 4,381 (−17.7%)
- Time zone: UTC+3 (MSK)
- Postal code: 155310
- OKTMO ID: 24601160051

Staraya Vichuga (Russian: Старая Вичуга) is an urban-type settlement in Vichugsky District, Ivanovo Oblast, Russia. Population: 4,568 (2021 census); 5,325 (2010 census); 5,797 (2002 census); 6,191 (1989 Soviet census).
