= Yuzhsky District =

Yuzhsky District Южский район (Russian)
- District
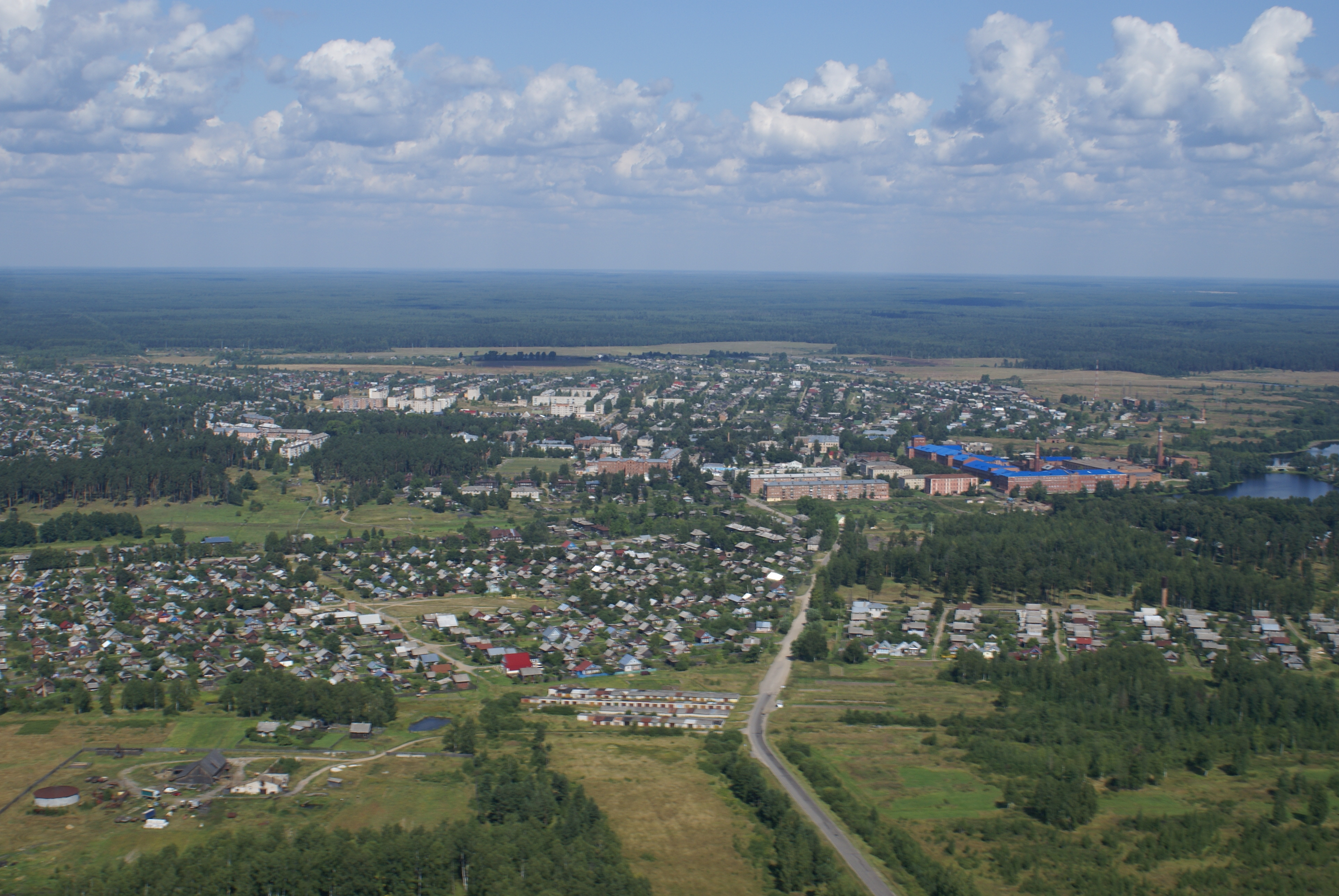
- View of Yuzhu, Yuzhsky District

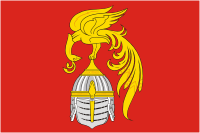
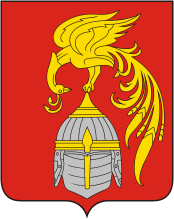
- Flag Coat of arms
- Location of Yuzhsky District in Ivanovo Oblast
- Coordinates: 56°35′N 42°01′E
- Country: Russia
- Federal subject: Ivanovo Oblast
- Administrative center: Yuzha

Area
  - Total: 1,341 km^{2} (518 sq mi)

Population (2010 Census)
  - Total: 25,728
  - Density: 19.19/km^{2} (49.69/sq mi)
  - Urban: 55.1%
  - Rural: 44.9%

Administrative structure
  - Inhabited localities: 1 cities/towns, 81 rural localities

Municipal structure
  - Municipally incorporated as: Yuzhsky Municipal District
  - Municipal divisions: 1 urban settlements, 6 rural settlements
- Time zone: UTC+3 (MSK)
- OKTMO ID: 24635000
- Website: http://yuzha.ru

Yuzhsky District (Russian: Ю́жский райо́н) is an administrative and municipal district (raion), one of the twenty-one in Ivanovo Oblast, Russia. It is located in the south of the oblast. The area of the district is 1,341 square kilometers (518 sq mi). Its administrative center is the town of Yuzha. Population: 19,796 (2021 census); 25,728 (2010 census); 28,793 (2002 Census); 33,792 (1989 Soviet census). The population of Yuzha accounts for 65.6% of the district's total population.

== Administrative and municipal status ==
The town of Yuzha serves as the administrative center of the district. Prior to the adoption of the Law #145-OZ On the Administrative-Territorial Division of Ivanovo Oblast in December 2010, it was administratively incorporated separately from the district. Municipally, Yuzha is incorporated within Yuzhsky Municipal District as Yuzhskoye Urban Settlement.
