= Yuzha =

Town in Ivanovo Oblast, Russia

Yuzha Южа
- Town
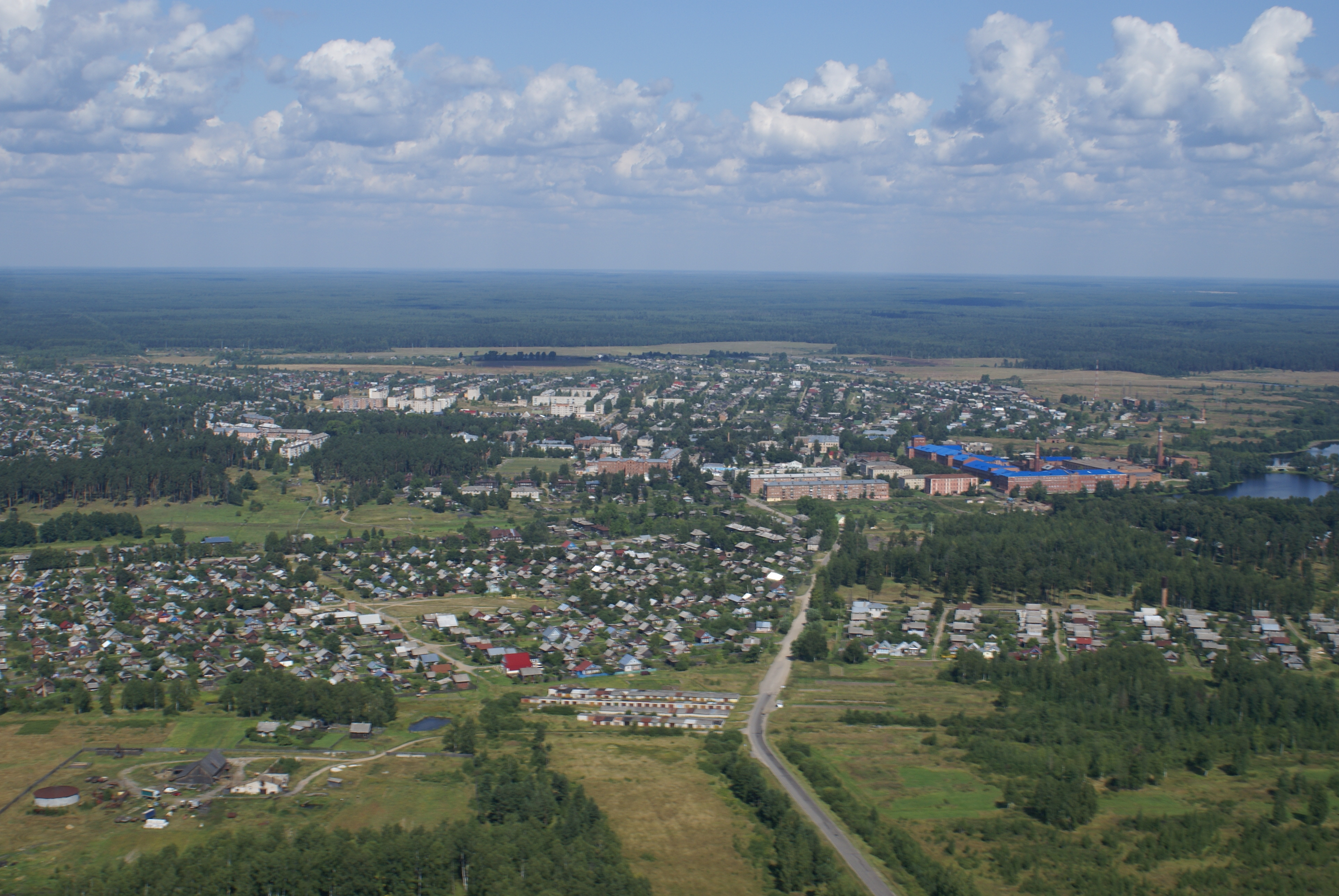
- View of Yuzha
- Interactive map of Yuzha
- Location of Yuzha Yuzha (Ivanovo Oblast)
- Coordinates: 56°35′N 42°02′E
- Country: Russia
- Federal subject: Ivanovo Oblast
- Administrative district: Yuzhsky District
- First mentioned: 1628
- Town status since: 1925
- Elevation: 105 m (344 ft)

Population (2010 Census)
  - Total: 14,170
  - Estimate (2021): 12,957 (−8.6%)

Administrative status
  - Capital of: Yuzhsky District

Municipal status
  - Municipal district: Yuzhsky Municipal District
  - Urban settlement: Yuzhskoye Urban Settlement
  - Capital of: Yuzhsky Municipal District, Yuzhskoye Urban Settlement
- Time zone: UTC+3 (MSK)
- Postal code: 155630
- OKTMO ID: 24635101001
- Website: yuzha.ru/news/

Yuzha (Russian: Ю́жа) is a town and the administrative center of Yuzhsky District in Ivanovo Oblast, Russia, located on Lake Vazal, 95 kilometers (59 mi) southeast of Ivanovo, the administrative center of the oblast. Population: 12,957 (2021 census); 14,170 (2010 census); 15,636 (2002 census); 20,892 (1989 Soviet census).

== History ==
A settlement on place of modern Yuzha existed since the beginning of the 15th century. The village of Yuzha was first mentioned in 1628. Town status was granted to it in 1925.

== Administrative and municipal status ==
Within the framework of administrative divisions, Yuzha serves as the administrative center of Yuzhsky District, to which it is directly subordinated. Prior to the adoption of the Law #145-OZ On the Administrative-Territorial Division of Ivanovo Oblast in December 2010, it used to be incorporated separately as an administrative unit with the status equal to that of the districts.

As a municipal division, the town of Yuzha, together with five rural localities in Yuzhsky District, is incorporated within Yuzhsky Municipal District as Yuzhskoye Urban Settlement.
