= Komsomolsk, Ivanovo Oblast =

Town in Ivanovo Oblast, Russia

Komsomolsk Комсомольск
- Town
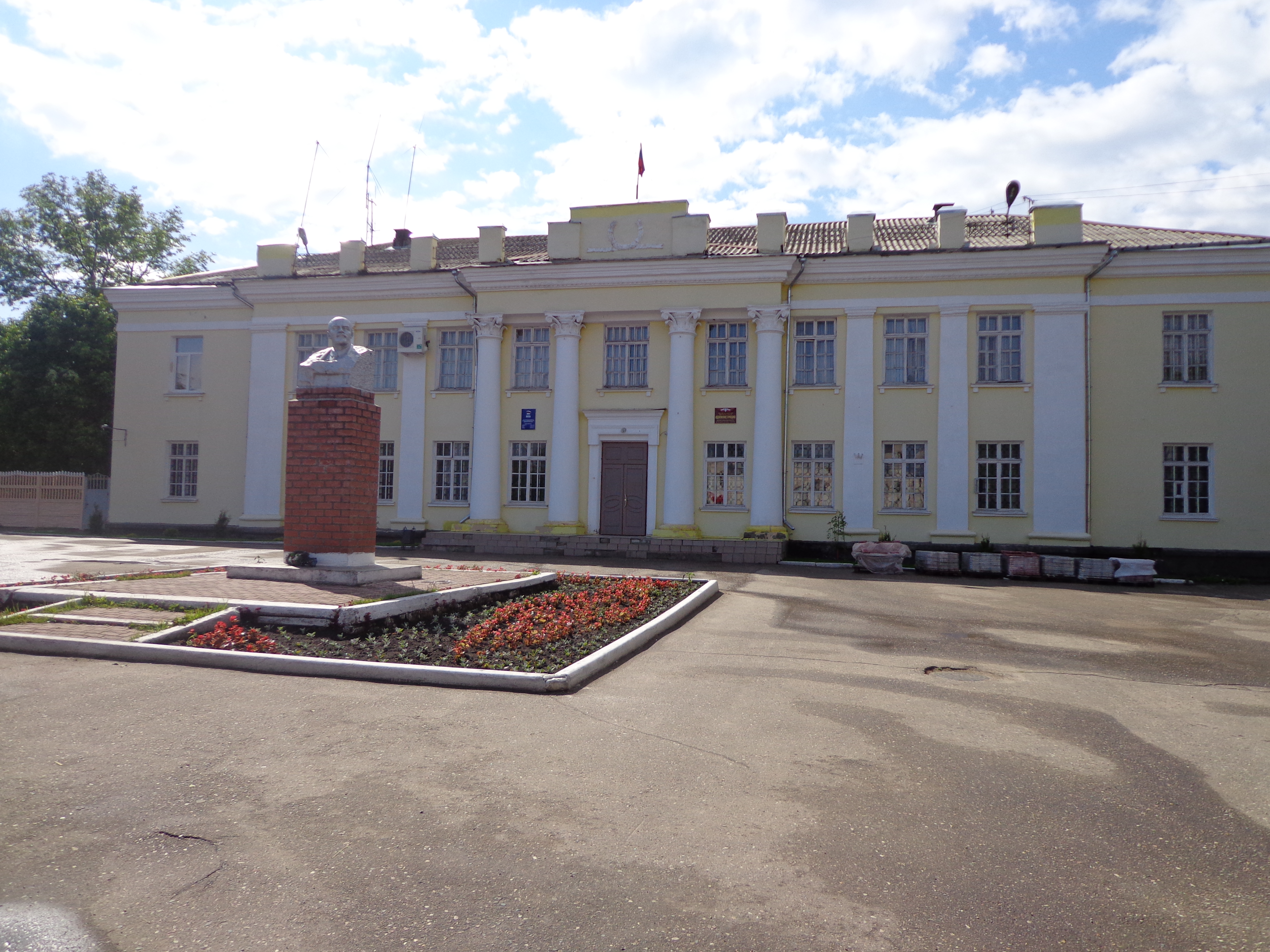
- Komsomolsk Town Administration building
- Interactive map of Komsomolsk
- Location of Komsomolsk Komsomolsk (Ivanovo Oblast)
- Coordinates: 57°01′34″N 40°22′44″E
- Country: Russia
- Federal subject: Ivanovo Oblast
- Administrative district: Komsomolsky District
- Founded: 1931
- Town status since: 1950
- Elevation: 145 m (476 ft)

Population (2010 Census)
  - Total: 8,693
  - Estimate (2021): 8,364 (−3.8%)

Administrative status
  - Capital of: Komsomolsky District

Municipal status
  - Municipal district: Komsomolsky Municipal District
  - Urban settlement: Komsomolskoye Urban Settlement
  - Capital of: Komsomolsky Municipal District, Komsomolskoye Urban Settlement
- Time zone: UTC+3 (MSK)
- Postal code: 155150
- OKTMO ID: 24613101001
- Website: web.archive.org/web/20140104045154/http://komsomolsk37.ru/

Komsomolsk (Russian: Комсомо́льск) is a town and the administrative center of Komsomolsky District in Ivanovo Oblast, Russia, located on the Ukhtokhma River (Uvod's tributary) 34 kilometers (21 mi) west of Ivanovo, the administrative center of the oblast. Population: 8,364 (2021 census); 8,693 (2010 census); 9,595 (2002 census); 11,587 (1989 Soviet census).

== History ==
It was founded in 1931 and granted town status in 1950.

== Administrative and municipal status ==
Within the framework of administrative divisions, Komsomolsk serves as the administrative center of Komsomolsky District, to which it is directly subordinated. Prior to the adoption of the Law #145-OZ On the Administrative-Territorial Division of Ivanovo Oblast in December 2010, it used to be incorporated separately as an administrative unit with the status equal to that of the districts.

As a municipal division, the town of Komsomolsk is incorporated within Komsomolsky Municipal District as Komsomolskoye Urban Settlement.
