= Komsomolsky District, Ivanovo Oblast =

Komsomolsky District Комсомольский район (Russian)
- District
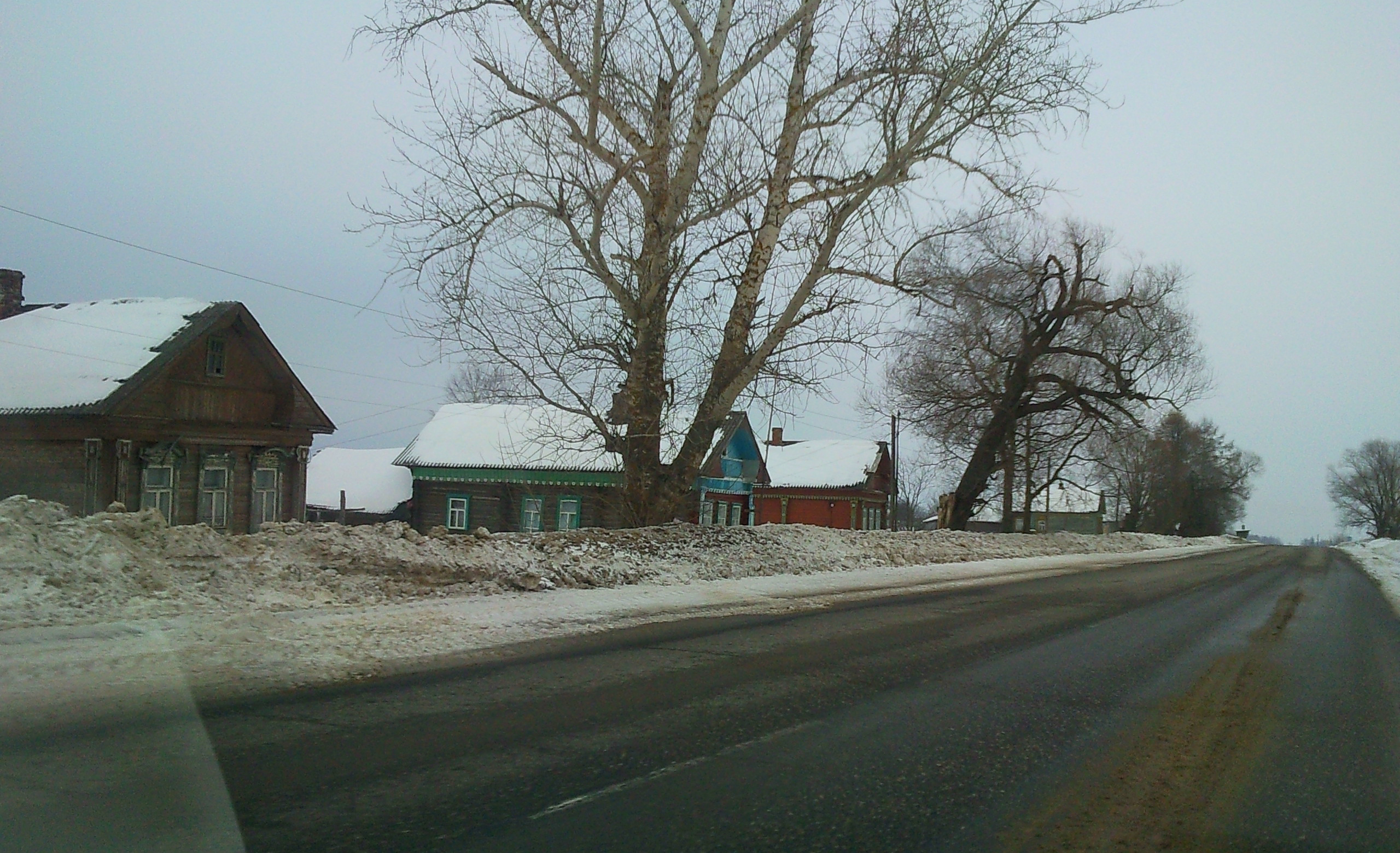
- Village (selo) Kodzhukovo, Komsomolsky District

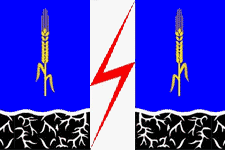
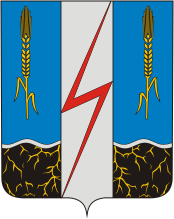
- Flag Coat of arms
- Location of Komsomolsky District in Ivanovo Oblast
- Coordinates: 57°02′N 40°23′E
- Country: Russia
- Federal subject: Ivanovo Oblast
- Administrative center: Komsomolsk

Area
  - Total: 1,220 km^{2} (470 sq mi)

Population (2010 Census)
  - Total: 20,263
  - Density: 16.6/km^{2} (43.0/sq mi)
  - Urban: 42.9%
  - Rural: 57.1%

Administrative structure
  - Inhabited localities: 1 cities/towns, 113 rural localities

Municipal structure
  - Municipally incorporated as: Komsomolsky Municipal District
  - Municipal divisions: 1 urban settlements, 5 rural settlements
- Time zone: UTC+3 (MSK)
- OKTMO ID: 24613000
- Website: http://adm-komsomolsk.ru/

Komsomolsky District (Russian: Комсомо́льский райо́н) is an administrative and municipal district (raion), one of the twenty-one in Ivanovo Oblast, Russia. It is located in the northwest of the oblast. The district area is 1,220 square kilometers (470 sq mi). Its administrative center is the town of Komsomolsk. Population: 20,263 (2021 census); 19,482 (2010 census); 22,042 (2002 Census); 27,708 (1989 Soviet census). The population of Komsomolsk accounts for 42.9% of the district's total population.

== Administrative and municipal status ==
The town of Komsomolsk serves as the administrative center of the district. Prior to the adoption of the Law #145-OZ On the Administrative-Territorial Division of Ivanovo Oblast in December 2010, it was administratively incorporated separately from the district. Municipally, Komsomolsk is incorporated within Komsomolsky Municipal District as Komsomolskoye Urban Settlement.
