= Medvedevo =

Medvedevo (Russian: Медве́дево) is the name of several inhabited localities in Russia.

== Modern localities ==
=== Arkhangelsk Oblast ===
As of 2012, two rural localities in Arkhangelsk Oblast bear this name:

- Medvedevo, Kargopolsky District, Arkhangelsk Oblast, a village in Krechetovsky Selsoviet of Kargopolsky District
- Medvedevo, Onezhsky District, Arkhangelsk Oblast, a village in Chekuyevsky Selsoviet of Onezhsky District

=== Chelyabinsk Oblast ===
As of 2012, one rural locality in Chelyabinsk Oblast bears this name:

- Medvedevo, Chelyabinsk Oblast, a selo in Timiryazevsky Selsoviet of Chebarkulsky District

=== Republic of Crimea ===
As of 2012, one rural locality in Republic of Crimea bears this name:

- Medvedevo, Republic of Crimea, a selo in Chernomorsky District

=== Ivanovo Oblast ===
As of 2012, two rural localities in Ivanovo Oblast bear this name:

- Medvedevo, Lukhsky District, Ivanovo Oblast, a village in Lukhsky District
- Medvedevo, Teykovsky District, Ivanovo Oblast, a village in Teykovsky District

=== Kaliningrad Oblast ===
As of 2012, one rural locality in Kaliningrad Oblast bears this name:

- Medvedevo, Kaliningrad Oblast, a settlement in Krasnotorovsky Rural Okrug of Zelenogradsky District

=== Kirov Oblast ===
As of 2012, one rural locality in Kirov Oblast bears this name:

- Medvedevo, Kirov Oblast, a village in Voysky Rural Okrug of Pizhansky District; 57°11′N 48°41′E

=== Kostroma Oblast ===
As of 2012, one rural locality in Kostroma Oblast bears this name:

- Medvedevo, Kostroma Oblast, a village in Leontyevskoye Settlement of Manturovsky District; 58°6′N 44°20′E

=== Lipetsk Oblast ===
As of 2012, one rural locality in Lipetsk Oblast bears this name:

- Medvedevo, Lipetsk Oblast, a village in Slobodskoy Selsoviet of Lebedyansky District; 53°4′N 38°50′E

=== Mari El Republic ===
As of 2012, one urban locality in the Mari El Republic bears this name:

- Medvedevo, Mari El Republic, an urban-type settlement in Medvedevsky District; 56°38′N 47°49′E

=== Moscow Oblast ===
As of 2012, two rural localities in Moscow Oblast bear this name:

- Medvedevo, Stupinsky District, Moscow Oblast, a village in Leontyevskoye Rural Settlement of Stupinsky District; 55°4′N 38°24′E
- Medvedevo, Voskresensky District, Moscow Oblast, a village in Ashitkovskoye Rural Settlement of Voskresensky District; 55°25′N 38°44′E

=== Nizhny Novgorod Oblast ===
As of 2012, one rural locality in Nizhny Novgorod Oblast bears this name:

- Medvedevo, Nizhny Novgorod Oblast, a village in Medvedevsky Selsoviet under the administrative jurisdiction of the town of oblast significance of Semyonov; 56°45′N 44°29′E

=== Novgorod Oblast ===
As of 2012, three rural localities in Novgorod Oblast bear this name:

- Medvedevo, Moshenskoy District, Novgorod Oblast, a village in Kalininskoye Settlement of Moshenskoy District
- Medvedevo, Bogoslovskoye Settlement, Pestovsky District, Novgorod Oblast, a village in Bogoslovskoye Settlement of Pestovsky District
- Medvedevo, Okhonskoye Settlement, Pestovsky District, Novgorod Oblast, a village in Okhonskoye Settlement of Pestovsky District

=== Oryol Oblast ===
As of 2012, one rural locality in Oryol Oblast bears this name:

- Medvedevo, Oryol Oblast, a village in Platonovsky Selsoviet of Orlovsky District; 53°1′N 36°13′E

=== Perm Krai ===
As of 2012, two rural localities in Perm Krai bear this name:

- Medvedevo, Bolshesosnovsky District, Perm Krai, a village in Bolshesosnovsky District
- Medvedevo, Kishertsky District, Perm Krai, a selo in Kishertsky District

=== Pskov Oblast ===
As of 2012, two rural localities in Pskov Oblast bear this name:

- Medvedevo, Gdovsky District, Pskov Oblast, a village in Gdovsky District
- Medvedevo, Palkinsky District, Pskov Oblast, a village in Palkinsky District

=== Ryazan Oblast ===
As of 2012, one rural locality in Ryazan Oblast bears this name:

- Medvedevo, Ryazan Oblast, a village in Poshchupovsky Rural Okrug of Rybnovsky District

=== Smolensk Oblast ===
As of 2012, one rural locality in Smolensk Oblast bears this name:

- Medvedevo, Smolensk Oblast, a village in Medvedevskoye Rural Settlement of Tyomkinsky District

=== Sverdlovsk Oblast ===
As of 2012, one rural locality in Sverdlovsk Oblast bears this name:

- Medvedevo, Sverdlovsk Oblast, a selo in Medvedevsky Selsoviet under the administrative jurisdiction of the Town of Nizhnyaya Salda

=== Tver Oblast ===
As of 2012, nine rural localities in Tver Oblast bear this name:

- Medvedevo, Belsky District, Tver Oblast, a village in Demyakhovskoye Rural Settlement of Belsky District
- Medvedevo, Bologovsky District, Tver Oblast, a village in Kemetskoye Rural Settlement of Bologovsky District
- Medvedevo, Kashinsky District, Tver Oblast, a village in Farafonovskoye Rural Settlement of Kashinsky District
- Medvedevo, Konakovsky District, Tver Oblast, a village in Yuryevo-Devichyevskoye Rural Settlement of Konakovsky District
- Medvedevo, Krasnokholmsky District, Tver Oblast, a village in Barbinskoye Rural Settlement of Krasnokholmsky District
- Medvedevo, Rzhevsky District, Tver Oblast, a village in Medvedevo Rural Settlement of Rzhevsky District
- Medvedevo, Selizharovsky District, Tver Oblast, a village in Talitskoye Rural Settlement of Selizharovsky District
- Medvedevo, Toropetsky District, Tver Oblast, a village in Ploskoshskoye Rural Settlement of Toropetsky District
- Medvedevo, Vyshnevolotsky District, Tver Oblast, a village in Yesenovichskoye Rural Settlement of Vyshnevolotsky District

=== Tyumen Oblast ===
As of 2012, one rural locality in Tyumen Oblast bears this name:

- Medvedevo, Tyumen Oblast, a selo in Medvedevsky Rural Okrug of Golyshmanovsky District

=== Vladimir Oblast ===
As of 2012, one rural locality in Vladimir Oblast bears this name:

- Medvedevo, Vladimir Oblast, a village in Vyaznikovsky District

=== Volgograd Oblast ===
As of 2012, one rural locality in Volgograd Oblast bears this name:

- Medvedevo, Volgograd Oblast, a selo in Orekhovsky Selsoviet of Danilovsky District

=== Vologda Oblast ===
As of 2012, six rural localities in Vologda Oblast bear this name:

- Medvedevo, Anokhinsky Selsoviet, Gryazovetsky District, Vologda Oblast, a village in Anokhinsky Selsoviet of Gryazovetsky District
- Medvedevo, Pertsevsky Selsoviet, Gryazovetsky District, Vologda Oblast, a village in Pertsevsky Selsoviet of Gryazovetsky District
- Medvedevo, Nesterovsky Selsoviet, Sokolsky District, Vologda Oblast, a village in Nesterovsky Selsoviet of Sokolsky District
- Medvedevo, Prigorodny Selsoviet, Sokolsky District, Vologda Oblast, a village in Prigorodny Selsoviet of Sokolsky District
- Medvedevo, Totemsky District, Vologda Oblast, a village in Medvedevsky Selsoviet of Totemsky District
- Medvedevo, Vologodsky District, Vologda Oblast, a village in Sosnovsky Selsoviet of Vologodsky District

=== Yaroslavl Oblast ===
As of 2012, four rural localities in Yaroslavl Oblast bear this name:

- Medvedevo, Bolsheselsky District, Yaroslavl Oblast, a village in Blagoveshchensky Rural Okrug of Bolsheselsky District
- Medvedevo, Rostovsky District, Yaroslavl Oblast, a village in Fatyanovsky Rural Okrug of Rostovsky District
- Medvedevo, Tutayevsky District, Yaroslavl Oblast, a village in Chebakovsky Rural Okrug of Tutayevsky District
- Medvedevo, Yaroslavsky District, Yaroslavl Oblast, a village in Levtsovsky Rural Okrug of Yaroslavsky District

== Alternative names ==
- Medvedevo, alternative name of Medvedovo, a selo in Medvedovsky Rural Administrative Okrug of Klintsovsky District in Bryansk Oblast; 52°35′N 32°29′E
- Medvedevo, alternative name of Medvedovo, a village in Volynovsky Selsoviet of Vetluzhsky District in Nizhny Novgorod Oblast; 57°52′N 45°26′E
