= Kozhino =

Kozhino (Russian: Кожино) is the name of several rural localities in Russia.

== Modern localities ==
=== Kirov Oblast ===
As of 2012, one rural locality in Kirov Oblast bears this name:

- Kozhino, Kirov Oblast, a village in Gostovsky Rural Okrug of Shabalinsky District; 58°7′N 46°31′E

=== Moscow Oblast ===
As of 2012, four rural localities in Moscow Oblast bear this name:

- Kozhino, Mozhaysky District, Moscow Oblast, a village in Poretskoye Rural Settlement of Mozhaysky District
- Kozhino (rural locality), Dorokhovskoye Rural Settlement, Ruzsky District, Moscow Oblast, a settlement in Dorokhovskoye Rural Settlement of Ruzsky District
- Kozhino (rural locality), Dorokhovskoye Rural Settlement, Ruzsky District, Moscow Oblast, a village in Dorokhovskoye Rural Settlement of Ruzsky District
- Kozhino, Staroruzskoye Rural Settlement, Ruzsky District, Moscow Oblast, a village in Staroruzskoye Rural Settlement of Ruzsky District

=== Nizhny Novgorod Oblast ===
As of 2012, two rural localities in Nizhny Novgorod Oblast bear this name:

- Kozhino, Arzamassky District, Nizhny Novgorod Oblast, a selo in Berezovsky Selsoviet of Arzamassky District
- Kozhino, Lyskovsky District, Nizhny Novgorod Oblast, a village in Kislovsky Selsoviet of Lyskovsky District

=== Novgorod Oblast ===
As of 2012, one rural locality in Novgorod Oblast bears this name:

- Kozhino, Novgorod Oblast, a village in Molvotitskoye Settlement of Maryovsky District

=== Perm Krai ===
As of 2012, one rural locality in Perm Krai bears this name:

- Kozhino, Perm Krai, a village in Bolshesosnovsky District

=== Pskov Oblast ===
As of 2012, six rural localities in Pskov Oblast bear this name:

- Kozhino (Porechenskoye Rural Settlement), Bezhanitsky District, Pskov Oblast, a village in Bezhanitsky District; municipally, a part of Porechenskoye Rural Settlement of that district
- Kozhino (Kudeverskaya Rural Settlement), Bezhanitsky District, Pskov Oblast, a village in Bezhanitsky District; municipally, a part of Kudeverskaya Rural Settlement of that district
- Kozhino, Kunyinsky District, Pskov Oblast, a village in Kunyinsky District
- Kozhino (Berezhanskaya Rural Settlement), Ostrovsky District, Pskov Oblast, a village in Ostrovsky District; municipally, a part of Berezhanskaya Rural Settlement of that district
- Kozhino (Volkovskaya Rural Settlement), Ostrovsky District, Pskov Oblast, a village in Ostrovsky District; municipally, a part of Volkovskaya Rural Settlement of that district
- Kozhino, Pushkinogorsky District, Pskov Oblast, a village in Pushkinogorsky District

=== Smolensk Oblast ===
As of 2012, three rural localities in Smolensk Oblast bear this name:

- Kozhino, Gagarinsky District, Smolensk Oblast, a village in Nikolskoye Rural Settlement of Gagarinsky District
- Kozhino, Monastyrshchinsky District, Smolensk Oblast, a village in Sobolevskoye Rural Settlement of Monastyrshchinsky District
- Kozhino, Novoduginsky District, Smolensk Oblast, a village in Tesovskoye Rural Settlement of Novoduginsky District

=== Tula Oblast ===
As of 2012, one rural locality in Tula Oblast bears this name:

- Kozhino, Tula Oblast, a village in Zaytsevsky Rural Okrug of Leninsky District

=== Tver Oblast ===
As of 2012, four rural localities in Tver Oblast bear this name:

- Kozhino, Kashinsky District, Tver Oblast, a village in Davydovskoye Rural Settlement of Kashinsky District
- Kozhino, Maksatikhinsky District, Tver Oblast, a village in Seletskoye Rural Settlement of Maksatikhinsky District
- Kozhino, Udomelsky District, Tver Oblast, a village in Mstinskoye Rural Settlement of Udomelsky District
- Kozhino, Vyshnevolotsky District, Tver Oblast, a village in Yesenovichskoye Rural Settlement of Vyshnevolotsky District

=== Vladimir Oblast ===
As of 2012, two rural localities in Vladimir Oblast bear this name:

- Kozhino, Gorokhovetsky District, Vladimir Oblast, a village in Gorokhovetsky District
- Kozhino, Kolchuginsky District, Vladimir Oblast, a village in Kolchuginsky District

=== Vologda Oblast ===
As of 2012, five rural localities in Vologda Oblast bear this name:

- Kozhino, Oktyabrsky Selsoviet, Vologodsky District, Vologda Oblast, a village in Oktyabrsky Selsoviet of Vologodsky District
- Kozhino, Podlesny Selsoviet, Vologodsky District, Vologda Oblast, a village in Podlesny Selsoviet of Vologodsky District
- Kozhino, Pudegsky Selsoviet, Vologodsky District, Vologda Oblast, a village in Pudegsky Selsoviet of Vologodsky District
- Kozhino, Pudegsky Selsoviet, Vologodsky District, Vologda Oblast, a village in Pudegsky Selsoviet of Vologodsky District
- Kozhino, Vytegorsky District, Vologda Oblast, a village in Tudozersky Selsoviet of Vytegorsky District

=== Yaroslavl Oblast ===
As of 2012, one rural locality in Yaroslavl Oblast bears this name:

- Kozhino, Yaroslavl Oblast, a village in Bogorodsky Rural Okrug of Myshkinsky District

== Abolished localities ==
- Kozhino, Kostroma Oblast, a village in Zadorinsky Selsoviet of Parfenyevsky District in Kostroma Oblast; abolished on October 18, 2004
