= Krasnooktyabrsky, Russia =

Set index of articles associated with the same name

Krasnooktyabrsky (Russian: Краснооктя́брьский; masculine), Krasnooktyabrskaya (Краснооктя́брьская; feminine), or Krasnooktyabrskoye (Краснооктя́брьское; neuter) is the name of several inhabited localities in Russia.

== Modern localities ==
Urban localities

- Krasnooktyabrsky, Mari El Republic, an urban-type settlement in Medvedevsky District, Mari El Republic

Rural localities

- Krasnooktyabrsky, Republic of Adygea, a settlement in Maykopsky District of the Republic of Adygea
- Krasnooktyabrsky, Chelyabinsk Oblast, a settlement in Rodnikovsky Selsoviet of Troitsky District of Chelyabinsk Oblast
- Krasnooktyabrsky, Kirov Oblast, a settlement in Vozhgalsky Rural Okrug of Kumyonsky District of Kirov Oblast
- Krasnooktyabrsky, Kursk Oblast, a settlement in Veselovsky Selsoviet of Glushkovsky District of Kursk Oblast
- Krasnooktyabrsky, Orenburg Oblast, a settlement in Krasnooktyabrsky Selsoviet of Oktyabrsky District of Orenburg Oblast
- Krasnooktyabrsky, Penza Oblast, a settlement in Luninsky Selsoviet of Luninsky District of Penza Oblast
- Krasnooktyabrsky, Samara Oblast, a settlement in Bolshechernigovsky District of Samara Oblast
- Krasnooktyabrsky, Stavropol Krai, a settlement in Shturmovsky Selsoviet of Krasnogvardeysky District of Stavropol Krai
- Krasnooktyabrskoye, Republic of Dagestan, a selo in Novokokhanovsky Selsoviet of Kizlyarsky District of the Republic of Dagestan
- Krasnooktyabrskoye, Kaliningrad Oblast, a settlement in Kamensky Rural Okrug of Chernyakhovsky District of Kaliningrad Oblast
- Krasnooktyabrskoye, Kursk Oblast, a selo in Snagostsky Selsoviet of Korenevsky District of Kursk Oblast

== Historical localities ==
- Krasnooktyabrsky, Volgograd Oblast, formerly a work settlement under the administrative jurisdiction of the city of oblast significance of Volzhsky, Volgograd Oblast; merged into Volzhsky in April 2012

== See also ==
- Krasny Oktyabr (disambiguation)
