= Malyye Kizeli =

Malyye Kizeli Малые Кизели
- Village
- Location within Perm Krai Location within Russia
- Coordinates: 57°43′N 54°13′E
- Country: Russia
- Region: Perm Krai
- District: Bolshesosnovsky District
- Time zone: UTC+5:00

Malyye Kizeli (Russian: Малые Кизели) is a rural locality (a village) in Klenovskoye Selsoviet, Bolshesosnovsky District, Perm Krai, Russia. The population was 80 as of 2010. There are 2 streets.

== Geography ==
Malyye Kizeli is located 29 km northwest of Bolshaya Sosnova (the district's administrative centre) by road. Klenovka is the nearest rural locality.
