= Pikuli =

Pikuli Пикули
- Village
- Location within Perm Krai Location within Russia
- Coordinates: 57°21′N 54°32′E
- Country: Russia
- Region: Perm Krai
- District: Bolshesosnovsky District
- Time zone: UTC+5:00

Pikuli (Russian: Пикули) is a rural locality (a village) in Polozovoskoye Rural Settlement, Bolshesosnovsky District, Perm Krai, Russia. The population was 37 as of 2010. There are 2 streets.

== Geography ==
Pikuli is located on the Bolshoy Klyuch River, 52 km south of Bolshaya Sosnova (the district's administrative centre) by road. Berdyshevo is the nearest rural locality.
