= Vakhrino =

Vakhrino Вахрино
- Village
- Location within Perm Krai Location within Russia
- Coordinates: 57°18′N 54°21′E
- Country: Russia
- Region: Perm Krai
- District: Bolshesosnovsky District

Vakhrino (Russian: Вахрино) is a rural locality (a village) in Polozovoskoye Rural Settlement, Bolshesosnovsky District, Perm Krai, Russia. The population was 21 as of 2010.

== Geography ==
Vakhrino is located 48 km south of Bolshaya Sosnova (the district's administrative centre) by road. Osinovka is the nearest rural locality.
