= Solody =

Solody Солоды
- Selo
- Location within Perm Krai Location within Russia
- Coordinates: 57°35′N 54°08′E
- Country: Russia
- Region: Perm Krai
- District: Bolshesosnovsky District
- Time zone: UTC+5:00

Solody (Russian: Солоды) is a rural locality (a selo) in Petropavlovskoye Rural Settlement, Bolshesosnovsky District, Perm Krai, Russia. The population was 166 as of 2010. There are 8 streets.

== Geography ==
Solody is located 33 km southwest of Bolshaya Sosnova (the district's administrative centre) by road. Seletki is the nearest rural locality.
