= Zhelnino =

Zhelnino Желнино
- Village
- Location within Perm Krai Location within Russia
- Coordinates: 57°32′N 54°39′E
- Country: Russia
- Region: Perm Krai
- District: Bolshesosnovsky District
- Time zone: UTC+5:00

Zhelnino (Russian: Желнино) is a rural locality (a village) in Chernovskoye Rural Settlement, Bolshesosnovsky District, Perm Krai, Russia. The population was 44 as of 2010. It has one street.

== Geography ==
Zhelnino is located on the Sosnova River, 28 km south of Bolshaya Sosnova (the district's administrative centre) by road. Lykovo is the nearest rural locality.
