= Lisya =

Lisya Лисья
- Village
- Location within Perm Krai Location within Russia
- Coordinates: 57°15′N 54°21′E
- Country: Russia
- Region: Perm Krai
- District: Bolshesosnovsky District

Area
  - Total: 0.99 km^{2} (0.38 sq mi)
- Time zone: UTC+5:00

Lisya (Russian: Лисья) is a rural locality (a village) in Polozovoskoye Rural Settlement, Bolshesosnovsky District, Perm Krai, Russia. The population was 189 as of 2010. There are 6 streets.

== Geography ==
Lisya is located 55 km south of Bolshaya Sosnova (the district's administrative centre) by road. Pozory is the nearest rural locality.
