= Stary Lyp =

Stary Lyp Старый Лып
- Village
- Location within Perm Krai Location within Russia
- Coordinates: 57°22′N 54°16′E
- Country: Russia
- Region: Perm Krai
- District: Bolshesosnovsky District
- Time zone: UTC+5:00

Stary Lyp (Russian: Старый Лып) is a rural locality (a village) in Polozovoskoye Rural Settlement, Bolshesosnovsky District, Perm Krai, Russia. The population was 72 as of 2010. There are 2 streets.

== Geography ==
Stary Lyp is located on the Lyp River, 49 km southwest of Bolshaya Sosnova (the district's administrative centre) by road. Nizhny Lyp is the nearest rural locality.
