= Lyovino =

Lyovino Лёвино
- Selo
- Location within Perm Krai Location within Russia
- Coordinates: 57°37′N 54°49′E
- Country: Russia
- Region: Perm Krai
- District: Bolshesosnovsky District
- Time zone: UTC+5:00

Lyovino (Russian: Лёвино) is a rural locality (a selo) and the administrative center of Levinskoye Rural Settlement, Bolshesosnovsky District, Perm Krai, Russia. The population was 321 as of 2010. There are 11 streets.

== Geography ==
Lyovino is located 22 km east of Bolshaya Sosnova (the district's administrative centre) by road. Burdino is the nearest rural locality.
