= Berdyshevo =

Berdyshevo Бердышево
- Selo
- Location within Perm Krai Location within Russia
- Coordinates: 57°19′N 54°27′E
- Country: Russia
- Region: Perm Krai
- District: Bolshesosnovsky District
- Time zone: UTC+5:00

Berdyshevo (Russian: Бердышево) is a rural locality (a selo) in Polozovoskoye Rural Settlement, Bolshesosnovsky District, Perm Krai, Russia. The population was 319 as of 2010. There are 4 streets.

== Geography ==
Berdyshevo is located 45 km south of Bolshaya Sosnova, the district's administrative centre, by road. Gori is the nearest rural locality.
