= Drobiny =

Drobiny Дробины
- Village
- Location within Perm Krai Location within Russia
- Coordinates: 57°47′N 54°11′E
- Country: Russia
- Region: Perm Krai
- District: Bolshesosnovsky District
- Time zone: UTC+5:00

Drobiny (Russian: Дробины) is a rural locality (a village) in Klenovskoye Selsoviet, Bolshesosnovsky District, Perm Krai, Russia. The population was 37 as of 2010. There is 1 street.

== Geography ==
Drobiny is located on the Cheptsa River, 36 km northwest of Bolshaya Sosnova (the district's administrative centre) by road. Malye Kizeli is the nearest rural locality.
