= Permyaki =

Permyaki Пермяки
- Selo
- Location within Perm Krai Location within Russia
- Coordinates: 57°39′N 54°08′E
- Country: Russia
- Region: Perm Krai
- District: Bolshesosnovsky District
- Time zone: UTC+5:00

Permyaki (Russian: Пермяки) is a rural locality (a selo) in Petropavlovskoye Rural Settlement, Bolshesosnovsky District, Perm Krai, Russia. The population was 171 as of 2010. There are 4 streets.

== Geography ==
Permyaki is located 31 km west of Bolshaya Sosnova (the district's administrative centre) by road. Kuznetsy is the nearest rural locality.
