= Chistoperevoloka =

Chistoperevoloka Чистопереволока
- Village
- Location within Perm Krai Location within Russia
- Coordinates: 57°33′N 54°47′E
- Country: Russia
- Region: Perm Krai
- District: Bolshesosnovsky District
- Time zone: UTC+5:00

Chistoperevoloka (Russian: Чистопереволока) is a rural locality (a village) in Levinskoye Rural Settlement, Bolshesosnovsky District, Perm Krai, Russia. The population was 14 as of 2010. There are 2 streets.

== Geography ==
Chistoperevoloka is located 22 km southeast of Bolshaya Sosnova (the district's administrative centre) by road. Medvedevo is the nearest rural locality.
