= Gladky Mys =

Gladky Mys Гладкий Мыс
- Village
- Location within Perm Krai Location within Russia
- Coordinates: 57°34′N 54°28′E
- Country: Russia
- Region: Perm Krai
- District: Bolshesosnovsky District
- Time zone: UTC+5:00

Gladky Mys (Russian: Гладкий Мыс) is a rural locality (a village) in Toykinskoye Rural Settlement, Bolshesosnovsky District, Perm Krai, Russia. The population was 14 as of 2010. There are 2 streets.

== Geography ==
Gladky Mys is located on the Chyornaya River, 27 km southwest of Bolshaya Sosnova (the district's administrative centre) by road. Kuzino is the nearest rural locality.
