= Lykovo =

Lykovo Лыково
- Village
- Location within Perm Krai Location within Russia
- Coordinates: 57°34′N 54°40′E
- Country: Russia
- Region: Perm Krai
- District: Bolshesosnovsky District
- Time zone: UTC+5:00

Lykovo (Russian: Лыково) is a rural locality (a village) in Bolshesosnovskoye Rural Settlement, Bolshesosnovsky District, Perm Krai, Russia. The population was 87 as of 2010. The village has one street.

== Geography ==
Lykovo is located 12 km southeast of Bolshaya Sosnova (the district's administrative centre) by road. Zhelnino is the nearest rural locality.
