= Bolshiye Kizeli =

Bolshiye Kizeli Большие Кизели
- Village
- Location within Perm Krai Location within Russia
- Coordinates: 57°41′N 54°15′E
- Country: Russia
- Region: Perm Krai
- District: Bolshesosnovsky District
- Time zone: UTC+5:00

Bolshiye Kizeli (Russian: Большие Кизели) is a rural locality (a village) in Petropavlovskoye Rural Settlement, Bolshesosnovsky District, Perm Krai, Russia. The population was 45 as of 2010. There are 2 streets.

== Geography ==
Bolshiye Kizeli is located 25 km northwest of Bolshaya Sosnova, the district's administrative centre, by road. Petropavlovsk is the nearest rural locality.
