= Verkh-Potka =

Verkh-Potka Верх-Потка
- Village
- Location within Perm Krai Location within Russia
- Coordinates: 57°31′N 54°18′E
- Country: Russia
- Region: Perm Krai
- District: Bolshesosnovsky District
- Time zone: UTC+5:00

Verkh-Potka (Russian: Верх-Потка) is a rural locality (a village) in Toykinskoye Rural Settlement, Bolshesosnovsky District, Perm Krai, Russia. The population was 232 as of 2010. There are 8 streets.

== Geography ==
Verkh-Potka is located 34 km southwest of Bolshaya Sosnova (the district's administrative centre) by road. Toykino is the nearest rural locality.
