= Krasnyye Gorki =

Krasnyye Gorki Красные Горки
- Settlement
- Location within Perm Krai Location within Russia
- Coordinates: 57°31′N 54°26′E
- Country: Russia
- Region: Perm Krai
- District: Bolshesosnovsky District
- Time zone: UTC+5:00

Krasnyye Gorki (Russian: Красные Горки) is a rural locality (a settlement) in Toykinskoye Rural Settlement, Bolshesosnovsky District, Perm Krai, Russia. The population was 18 as of 2010. There is 1 street.

== Geography ==
It is located three kilometres (1.9 mi) east of Toykino.
