= Nizhny Lyp =

Nizhny Lyp Нижний Лып
- Selo
- Location within Perm Krai Location within Russia
- Coordinates: 57°20′N 54°13′E
- Country: Russia
- Region: Perm Krai
- District: Bolshesosnovsky District
- Time zone: UTC+5:00

Nizhny Lyp (Russian: Нижний Лып) is a rural locality (a selo) in Polozovoskoye Rural Settlement, Bolshesosnovsky District, Perm Krai, Russia. The population was 315 as of 2010. There are 6 streets.

== Geography ==
Nizhny Lyp is located 54 km southwest of Bolshaya Sosnova (the district's administrative centre) by road. Kozhino is the nearest rural locality.
