= Kolokolovo =

Kolokolovo Колоколово
- Village
- Location within Perm Krai Location within Russia
- Coordinates: 57°43′N 54°20′E
- Country: Russia
- Region: Perm Krai
- District: Bolshesosnovsky District
- Time zone: UTC+5:00

Kolokolovo (Russian: Колоколово) is a rural locality (a village) in Klenovskoye Selsoviet, Bolshesosnovsky District, Perm Krai, Russia. The population was 1 as of 2010. There is 1 street.

== Geography ==
Kolokolovo is located 26 km northwest of Bolshaya Sosnova (the district's administrative centre) by road. Klenovka is the nearest rural locality.
