= Krasny Oktyabr =

Krasny Oktyabr (Russian: Красный Октябрь, lit. 'Red October') may refer to:

== Places ==
- Krasny Oktyabr, Belgorod Oblast, an urban-type settlement in Belgorod Oblast, Russia
- Krasny Oktyabr, Kurgan Oblast, an urban-type settlement in Kurgan Oblast, Russia
- Krasny Oktyabr, Saratov Oblast, an urban-type settlement in Saratov Oblast, Russia
- Krasny Oktyabr, Kirzhachsky District, Vladimir Oblast, merged with the town of Kirzhach

== Companies ==
- Krasny Oktyabr (confectionery brand), a Russian confectioner
- Krasny Oktyabr (steel plant), based in Volgograd
- Krasny Oktyabr (engine plant), based in Saint Petersburg

== Sport ==
- BC Krasny Oktyabr, a Russian basketball club, based in Volgograd

== Fiction ==
- Red October (fictional submarine), the submarine in the novel The Hunt for Red October by Tom Clancy and the subsequent film adaptation

== See also ==
- Krasnooktyabrsky (disambiguation)
- Red October (disambiguation)
- October Revolution (disambiguation)
