= Pichugi =

Pichugi Пичуги
- Village
- Location within Perm Krai Location within Russia
- Coordinates: 57°29′N 54°12′E
- Country: Russia
- Region: Perm Krai
- District: Bolshesosnovsky District
- Time zone: UTC+5:00

Pichugi (Russian: Пичуги) is a rural locality (a village) in Toykinskoye Rural Settlement, Bolshesosnovsky District, Perm Krai, Russia. The population was 6 as of 2010. There is 1 street.

== Geography ==
Pichugi is located 42 km southwest of Bolshaya Sosnova (the district's administrative centre) by road. Verkh-Potka is the nearest rural locality.
