= Baklushi =

Baklushi Баклуши
- Selo
- Location within Perm Krai Location within Russia
- Coordinates: 57°38′N 54°27′E
- Country: Russia
- Region: Perm Krai
- District: Bolshesosnovsky District
- Time zone: UTC+5:00

Baklushi (Russian: Баклуши) is a rural locality (a selo) in Bolshesosnovskoye Rural Settlement, Bolshesosnovsky District, Perm Krai, Russia. The population was 363 as of 2010. There are 4 streets.

== Geography ==
Baklushi is located 10 km southwest of Bolshaya Sosnova, the district's administrative centre, by road. Bolshaya Sosnova is the nearest rural locality.
