= Kiprino =

Kiprino Киприно
- Village
- Location within Perm Krai Location within Russia
- Coordinates: 57°38′N 54°07′E
- Country: Russia
- Region: Perm Krai
- District: Bolshesosnovsky District
- Time zone: UTC+5:00

Kiprino (Russian: Киприно) is a rural locality (a village) in Petropavlovskoye Rural Settlement, Bolshesosnovsky District, Perm Krai, Russia. The population was 10 as of 2010. There are streets.

== Geography ==
Kiprino is located on the Lem River, 33 km west of Bolshaya Sosnova (the district's administrative centre) by road. Permyaki is the nearest rural locality.
