= Lyagushino =

Lyagushino Лягушино
- Village
- Location within Perm Krai Location within Russia
- Coordinates: 57°27′N 54°36′E
- Country: Russia
- Region: Perm Krai
- District: Bolshesosnovsky District

Area
  - Total: 0.56 km^{2} (0.22 sq mi)
- Time zone: UTC+5:00

Lyagushino (Russian: Лягушино) is a rural locality (a village) in Chernovskoye Rural Settlement, Bolshesosnovsky District, Perm Krai, Russia. The population was 21 as of 2010. There is 1 street.

== Geography ==
Lyagushino is located 29 km south of Bolshaya Sosnova (the district's administrative centre) by road. Osinovka is the nearest rural locality.
