= Yurkovo =

Yurkovo Юрково
- Selo
- Location within Perm Krai Location within Russia
- Coordinates: 57°44′N 54°37′E
- Country: Russia
- Region: Perm Krai
- District: Bolshesosnovsky District
- Time zone: UTC+5:00

Yurkovo (Russian: Юрково) is a rural locality (a selo) in Bolshesosnovskoye Rural Settlement, Bolshesosnovsky District, Perm Krai, Russia. The population was 416 as of 2010. There are 7 streets.

== Geography ==
Yurkovo is located 10 km north of Bolshaya Sosnova (the district's administrative centre) by road. Verkh-Sosnova is the nearest rural locality.
