= Malaya Sosnova =

Malaya Sosnova Малая Соснова
- Selo
- Location within Perm Krai Location within Russia
- Coordinates: 57°37′N 54°38′E
- Country: Russia
- Region: Perm Krai
- District: Bolshesosnovsky District
- Time zone: UTC+5:00

Malaya Sosnova (Russian: Малая Соснова) is a rural locality (a selo) in Bolshesosnovskoye Rural Settlement, Bolshesosnovsky District, Perm Krai, Russia. The population was 360 as of 2010. There are 13 streets.

== Geography ==
Malaya Sosnova is located 6 km southeast of Bolshaya Sosnova (the district's administrative centre) by road. Bolshaya Sosnova is the nearest rural locality.
