= Cherknukhi =

Cherknukhi Чернухи
- Village
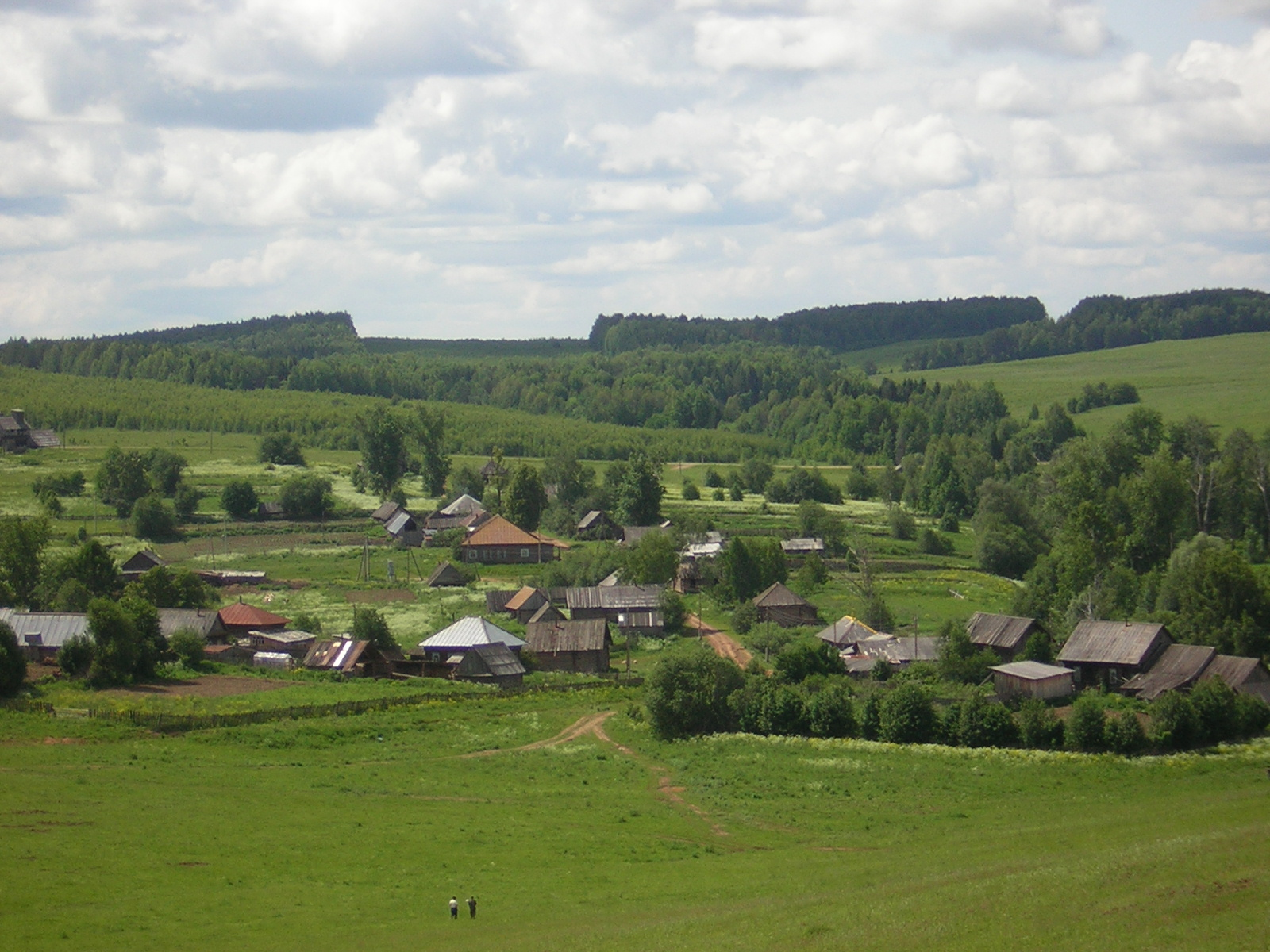
- Cherknukhi

- Location within Perm Krai Location within Russia
- Coordinates: 57°17′N 54°34′E
- Country: Russia
- Region: Perm Krai
- District: Bolshesosnovsky District
- Time zone: UTC+5:00

Cherknukhi (Russian: Чернухи) is a rural locality (a village) in Polozovoskoye Rural Settlement, Bolshesosnovsky District, Perm Krai, Russia. The population was 45 as of 2010. There are 4 streets.

== Geography ==
Cherknukhi is located on the Poludennaya River, 54 km south of Bolshaya Sosnova (the district's administrative centre) by road. Verkh-Shestaya is the nearest rural locality.
