= Seletki =

Seletki Селетки
- Village
- Location within Perm Krai Location within Russia
- Coordinates: 57°35′N 54°12′E
- Country: Russia
- Region: Perm Krai
- District: Bolshesosnovsky District
- Time zone: UTC+5:00

Seletki (Russian: Селетки) is a rural locality (a village) in Petropavlovskoye Rural Settlement, Bolshesosnovsky District, Perm Krai, Russia. The population was 26 as of 2010. There is 1 street.

== Geography ==
Seletki is located 30 km southwest of Bolshaya Sosnova (the district's administrative centre) by road. Solody is the nearest rural locality.
