= Red October (disambiguation) =

Red October is another name for the October Revolution of 1917 in Russia.

Red October may also refer to:

- Oktober Guard, a fictional special operations unit in G.I. Joe
- Red October (malware), a piece of cyber espionage malware revealed in 2013
- Red October (Philippines), also known as "Red October plot", an alleged rumor of ousting President Rodrigo Duterte from the office.
- Red October, the titular submarine featured in the Tom Clancy novel, The Hunt for Red October

== See also ==
- The Hunt for Red October (disambiguation)
- Krasny Oktyabr (disambiguation)
- Krasnyi Oktiabr (disambiguation)
- Krasnooktyabrsky (disambiguation)
- October Revolution (disambiguation)
