= Stafiyata =

Stafiyata Стафията
- Village
- Location within Perm Krai Location within Russia
- Coordinates: 57°15′N 54°25′E
- Country: Russia
- Region: Perm Krai
- District: Bolshesosnovsky District
- Time zone: UTC+5:00

Stafiyata (Russian: Стафията) is a rural locality (a village) in Polozovoskoye Rural Settlement, Bolshesosnovsky District, Perm Krai, Russia. The population was 3 as of 2010. There is 1 street.

== Geography ==
Stafiyata is located on the Siva River, 54 km south of Bolshaya Sosnova (the district's administrative centre) by road. Lisya is the nearest rural locality.
