= Verkh-Shestaya =

Verkh-Shestaya Верх-Шестая
- Village
- Location within Perm Krai Location within Russia
- Coordinates: 57°18′N 54°31′E
- Country: Russia
- Region: Perm Krai
- District: Bolshesosnovsky District
- Time zone: UTC+5:00

Verkh-Shestaya (Russian: Верх-Шестая) is a rural locality (a village) in Polozovoskoye Rural Settlement, Bolshesosnovsky District, Perm Krai, Russia. The population was 27 as of 2010. There are 2 streets.

== Geography ==
Verkh-Shestaya is located 51 km south of Bolshaya Sosnova (the district's administrative centre) by road. Chernukhi is the nearest rural locality.
