= Klenovka =

Klenovka Кленовка
- Selo
- Location within Perm Krai Location within Russia
- Coordinates: 57°44′N 54°19′E
- Country: Russia
- Region: Perm Krai
- District: Bolshesosnovsky District
- Time zone: UTC+5:00

Klenovka (Russian: Кленовка) is a rural locality (a selo) and the administrative center of Klenovskoye Selsoviet, Bolshesosnovsky District, Perm Krai, Russia. The population was 341 as of 2010. There are 5 streets.

== Geography ==
Klenovka is located 22 km northwest of Bolshaya Sosnova (the district's administrative centre) by road. Malye Kizeli is the nearest rural locality.
