= Marasany =

Marasany Марасаны
- Village
- Location within Perm Krai Location within Russia
- Coordinates: 57°26′N 54°24′E
- Country: Russia
- Region: Perm Krai
- District: Bolshesosnovsky District
- Time zone: UTC+5:00

Marasany (Russian: Марасаны) is a rural locality (a village) in Polozovoskoye Rural Settlement, Bolshesosnovsky District, Perm Krai, Russia. The population was 87 as of 2010. There are 3 streets.

== Geography ==
Marasany is located 38 km southwest of Bolshaya Sosnova (the district's administrative centre) by road. Sivinskoye is the nearest rural locality.
