= Zachernaya =

Zachernaya Зачерная
- Village
- Location within Perm Krai Location within Russia
- Coordinates: 57°30′N 54°30′E
- Country: Russia
- Region: Perm Krai
- District: Bolshesosnovsky District
- Time zone: UTC+5:00

Zachernaya (Russian: Зачерная) is a rural locality (a village) in Chernovskoye Rural Settlement, Bolshesosnovsky District, Perm Krai, Russia. The population is 76 as of 2010. There is one street.

== Geography ==
Zachernaya is located 23 km south of Bolshaya Sosnova (the district's administrative centre) by road. Chernovskoye is the nearest rural locality.
