= Zabolotovo =

Zabolotovo Заболотово
- Village
- Location within Perm Krai Location within Russia
- Coordinates: 57°42′N 54°27′E
- Country: Russia
- Region: Perm Krai
- District: Bolshesosnovsky District
- Time zone: UTC+5:00

Zabolotovo (Russian: Заболотово) is a rural locality (a village) in Klenovskoye Selsoviet, Bolshesosnovsky District, Perm Krai, Russia. The population was 334 as of 2010. There are 8 streets.

== Geography ==
Zabolotovo is located 17 km northwest of Bolshaya Sosnova (the district's administrative centre) by road. Shamary is the nearest rural locality.
