= Russky Lem =

Russky Lem Русский Лем
- Village
- Location within Perm Krai Location within Russia
- Coordinates: 57°39′N 54°04′E
- Country: Russia
- Region: Perm Krai
- District: Bolshesosnovsky District
- Time zone: UTC+5:00

Russky Lem (Russian: Русский Лем) is a rural locality (a village) in Petropavlovskoye Rural Settlement, Bolshesosnovsky District, Perm Krai, Russia. The population was 6 as of 2010. There is 1 street.

== Geography ==
It is located on the Lem River.
