= Yasnaya Polyana, Perm Krai =

Yasnaya Polyana Ясная Поляна
- Settlement
- Location within Perm Krai Location within Russia
- Coordinates: 57°31′N 54°25′E
- Country: Russia
- Region: Perm Krai
- District: Bolshesosnovsky District
- Time zone: UTC+5:00

Yasnaya Polyana (Russian: Ясная Поляна) is a rural locality (a settlement) in Toykinskoye Rural Settlement, Bolshesosnovsky District, Perm Krai, Russia. The population was 7 as of 2010. There is 1 street.

== Geography ==
It is located 2.5 km east from Toykino.
