= Sivinsky =

Sivinsky (masculine), Sivinskaya (feminine), or Sivinskoye (neuter) may refer to:

- Sivinsky District, a district of Perm Krai, Russia
- Sivinskoye, a rural locality (a village) in Perm Krai, Russia
