= Medvedevo, Bolshesosnovsky District, Perm Krai =

Medvedevo Медведево
- Village
- Location within Perm Krai Location within Russia
- Coordinates: 57°35′N 54°48′E
- Country: Russia
- Region: Perm Krai
- District: Bolshesosnovsky District
- Time zone: UTC+5:00

Medvedevo (Russian: Медведево) is a rural locality (a village) in Levinskoye Rural Settlement, Bolshesosnovsky District, Perm Krai, Russia. The population was 5 as of 2010. There is 1 street.

== Geography ==
Medvedevo is located on the Siva River, 26 km southeast of Bolshaya Sosnova (the district's administrative centre) by road. Burdino is the nearest rural locality.
