= Kozhino, Perm Krai =

Kozhino Кожино
- Village
- Location within Perm Krai Location within Russia
- Coordinates: 57°19′N 54°15′E
- Country: Russia
- Region: Perm Krai
- District: Bolshesosnovsky District
- Time zone: UTC+5:00

Kozhino (Russian: Кожино) is a rural locality (a village) in Polozovoskoye Rural Settlement, Bolshesosnovsky District, Perm Krai, Russia. The population was 2 as of 2010. There is 1 street.

== Geography ==
Kozhino is located on the Lyp River, 58 km northeast of Bolshaya Sosnova (the district's administrative centre) by road. Nizhny Lyp is the nearest rural locality.
