= Sivinskoye =

Sivinskoye Сивинское
- Village
- Location within Perm Krai Location within Russia
- Coordinates: 57°27′N 54°29′E
- Country: Russia
- Region: Perm Krai
- District: Bolshesosnovsky District
- Time zone: UTC+5:00

Sivinskoye (Russian: Сивинское) is a rural locality (a village) in Polozovoskoye Rural Settlement, Bolshesosnovsky District, Perm Krai, Russia. The population was 91 as of 2010. There are 2 streets.

== Geography ==
Sivinskoye is located 28 km south of Bolshaya Sosnova (the district's administrative centre) by road. Ploska is the nearest rural locality.
