= Krasnooktyabrsky =

Krasnooktyabrsky (masculine), Krasnooktyabrskaya (feminine), or Krasnooktyabrskoye (neuter) may refer to:

- Krasnooktyabrsky District, several districts and city districts in Russia
- Krasnooktyabrsky Urban Settlement, a municipal formation which the Urban-Type Settlement of Krasnooktyabrsky in Medvedevsky District of the Mari El Republic, Russia is incorporated as
- Krasnooktyabrskoye Urban Settlement, a municipal formation which the work settlement of Krasny Oktyabr in Saratovsky District of Saratov Oblast, Russia is incorporated as
- Krasnooktyabrsky, Russia (Krasnooktyabrskaya, Krasnooktyabrskoye), several inhabited localities in Russia
- Krasnooktyabrsky, former name of the town of Shopokov in Kyrgyzstan
