= Toykino =

Toykino Тойкино
- Selo
- Location within Perm Krai Location within Russia
- Coordinates: 57°31′N 54°32′E
- Country: Russia
- Region: Perm Krai
- District: Bolshesosnovsky District
- Time zone: UTC+5:00

Toykino (Russian: Тойкино) is a rural locality (a selo) and the administrative center of Toykinskoye Rural Settlement, Bolshesosnovsky District, Perm Krai, Russia. The population was 295 as of 2010. There are 6 streets.

== Geography ==
Toykino is located 29 km southwest of Bolshaya Sosnova (the district's administrative centre) by road. Yasnaya Polyana is the nearest rural locality.
