= Dolgany, Perm Krai =

Dolgany Долганы
- Village
- Location within Perm Krai Location within Russia
- Coordinates: 57°35′N 54°52′E
- Country: Russia
- Region: Perm Krai
- District: Bolshesosnovsky District
- Time zone: UTC+5:00

Dolgany (Russian: Долганы) is a rural locality (a village) in Levinskoye Rural Settlement, Bolshesosnovsky District, Perm Krai, Russia. The population was 7 as of 2010.

== Geography ==
It is located 6.5 km south-east from Levino.
