= October Crisis (disambiguation) =

The October Crisis was a kidnapping in October 1970 in the province of Quebec in Canada.

October Crisis may also refer to:

- Cuban Missile Crisis or October Crisis of 1962

== See also ==
- October Revolution (disambiguation)
