= Iyulsky =

Iyulsky (Russian: Июльский; masculine), Iyulskaya (Июльская; feminine), or Iyulskoye (Июльское; neuter) is the name of several rural localities in Russia:

- Iyulskoye, Kaliningrad Oblast, a settlement in Turgenevsky Rural Okrug of Polessky District of Kaliningrad Oblast
- Iyulskoye, Udmurt Republic, a selo in Iyulsky Selsoviet of Votkinsky District of the Udmurt Republic
