= February Revolution (disambiguation) =

The February Revolution usually refers to the first of two revolutions in Russia in 1917.

February Revolution may also refer to:

- French Revolution of 1848
- Austrian Civil War in 1934
- February Revolution (Paraguay) in 1936
- Philippine People Power Revolution in 1986
- Ukrainian Revolution of 2014

== See also ==
- Russian Revolution (disambiguation)
- March Revolution (disambiguation)
