= Krasnooktyabrsky District =

District name

Krasnooktyabrsky District is the name of several administrative and municipal districts in Russia.

== Districts of the federal subjects ==
Location of Nizhny Novgorod Oblast in Russia

- Krasnooktyabrsky District, Nizhny Novgorod Oblast, an administrative and municipal district of Nizhny Novgorod Oblast

== City divisions ==
- Krasnooktyabrsky City District, a city district of Volgograd, the administrative center of Volgograd Oblast
Location of Volgograd in Russia

== See also ==
- Krasnooktyabrsky (disambiguation)
