= The Hunt for Red October (disambiguation) =

The Hunt for Red October is a 1984 novel by Tom Clancy.

The Hunt for Red October may also refer to:

- The Hunt for Red October (film), a 1990 thriller film based on the novel
- The Hunt for Red October (board game), based on the book

== Video games ==
- The Hunt for Red October (1987 video game), based on the book
- The Hunt for Red October (1990 video game), based on the movie
- The Hunt for Red October (console game) (1991), based on the movie

== See also ==
- Red October (disambiguation)
- The Mask: The Hunt for Green October, a 1995 comic book limited series published by Dark Horse Comics
