= October Revolution (disambiguation) =

The October Revolution, or "Red October", was a revolution in Russia led by the Bolsheviks in 1917.

October Revolution may also refer to:

== Political events ==
- 5 October 1910 revolution, the overthrow of the Portuguese monarchy
- Aden Emergency, a revoloution in south yemen
- Xinhai Revolution in China of October 1911, sometimes called the October Revolution
- Polish October anti-Stalinist protests and riots of 1956
- The overthrow of Juan Federico Ponce Vaides and the beginning of the Guatemalan Revolution in 1944
- October 1964 Revolution in Sudan
- Peaceful Revolution in East Germany and the decisive events of October–November 1989
- Vienna Uprising or October Revolution of 1848
- Overthrow of Slobodan Milošević ("5 October Overthrow") in 2000 in Belgrade, Federal Republic of Yugoslavia
- October Rebellion, a series of protests surrounding the 2007 World Bank meetings in Washington D.C., U.S.
- Revolution of 1934, or Revolution of October 1934, a series of revolutionary strikes in Spain
- 2019–2021 Lebanese protests, a series of civil protests in Lebanon that began in October 2019 and is still ongoing
- 1993 Russian constitutional crisis, stand-off in Moscow between the Russian president Boris Yeltsin and the Russian parliament

== Other uses ==
- October Revolution Island, an island in the Russian Arctic, named after the Russian October Revolution
- Russian battleship Gangut (1911), recommissioned in 1925 as Oktyabrskaya Revolutsiya
- October Revolution in Jazz, a 1964 music festival
- The October Revolution (album), a live album of a concert celebrating the anniversary of the October Revolution in Jazz

== See also ==
- October Crisis (disambiguation)
- Red October (disambiguation)
- Krasny Oktyabr (disambiguation)
- Russian Revolution (disambiguation)
- November Revolution (disambiguation)
