= Russian Revolution (disambiguation) =

The Russian Revolution was a series of uprisings that led to the fall of the Russian Empire, the end of Russian involvement in the First World War (1914-1918), the Russian Civil War (1917-1923), and the establishment of the Union of Soviet Socialist Republics (USSR).

Russian Revolution may also refer to:

- 1905 Russian Revolution, a failed uprising in the Russian Empire but with some reforms and lasting effects
- February Revolution (disambiguation) (1917), the first phase of the Russian Revolution that led to the dissolution of the Russian Empire
- October Revolution (disambiguation) (1917), the second phase of the Russian Revolution that established the Bolshevik communist regime
- The series of left-wing uprisings against the Bolsheviks, sometimes referred to as the Third Russian Revolution (after February and October 1917)
- 1991 Soviet coup d'état attempt, popular resistance to the coup sometimes referred to as the Russian Revolution of 1991
