= November Revolution =

The term November Revolution may refer to:

- November Uprising, an uprising in partitioned Poland against the Russian Empire (also known as the "Cadet Revolution" or the "Polish–Russian War 1830-31")
- October Revolution of 1917 in Russia, which took place in October according to the Julian calendar, but in November according to the Gregorian calendar
- German Revolution of 1918–1919, a politically driven civil conflict in Germany at the end of World War I
- November 1963 Iraqi coup d'état, a coup which replaced the Ba'athist government with a Nasserist one.
- November Revolution (physics), referring to the series of changes in particle physics triggered by the discovery of the charm quark in November 1974
- Velvet Revolution, which ended the communist regime in Czechoslovakia in November 1989

== See also ==
- October Revolution (disambiguation)
