= March Revolution =

March Revolution may refer to:

- March Revolution (Denmark), 1848
- March Revolution (Ecuador), 1845
- March Revolution (Venezuela), 1858
- Revolutions of 1848 in the Austrian Empire
- the opening phase of the German revolutions of 1848–49
- February Revolution, 1917 in Russia; also known as the March Revolution
- Ruhr uprising, 1920 in the Weimar Republic
- 1963 Syrian coup d'état

== See also ==
- February Revolution (disambiguation)
