= Siva (river) =

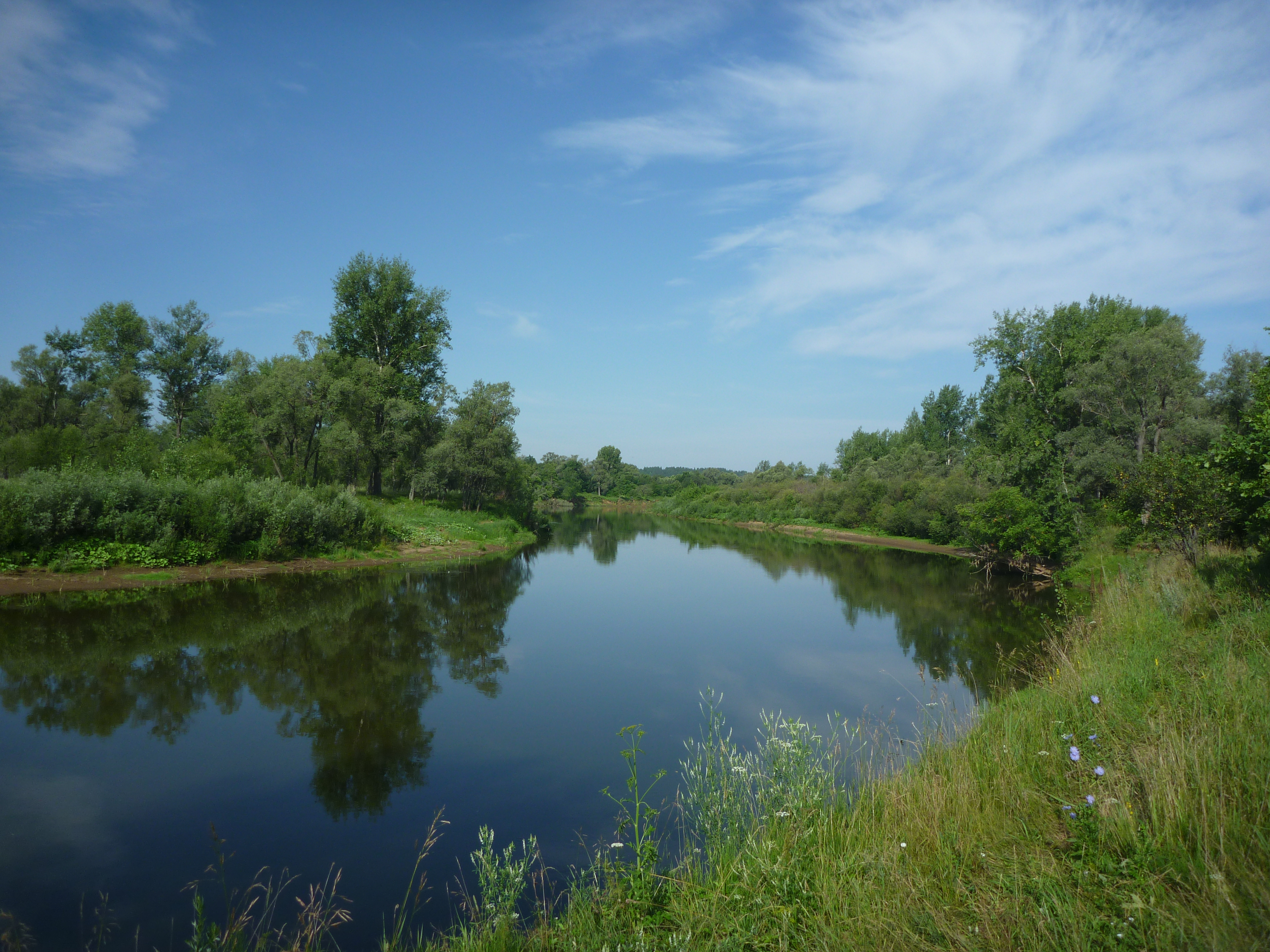
- The Siva in Udmurtia

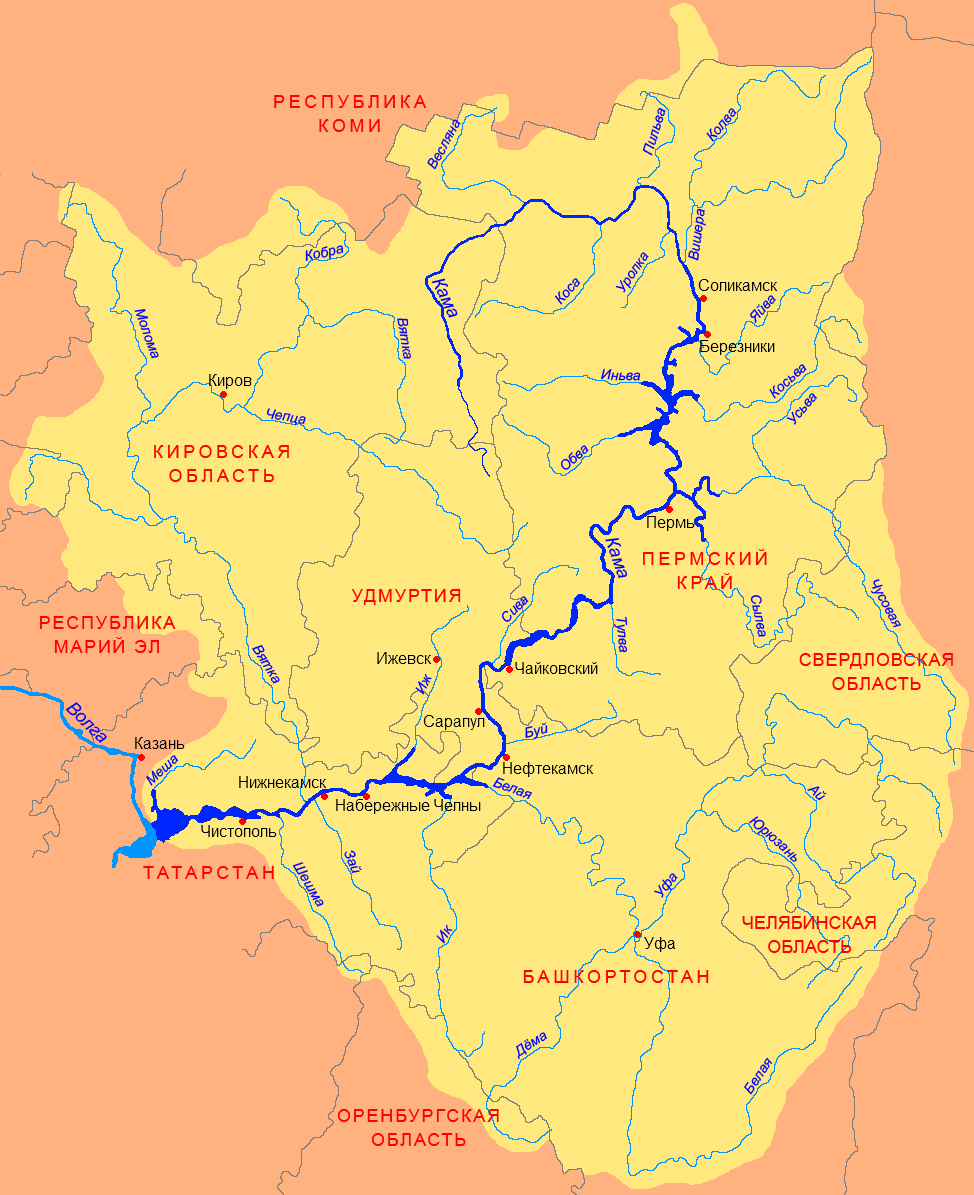
- Scheme of the Kama River Basin.

Location
- Country: Russia

Physical characteristics
- Source
  - location: Chastinsky District
- Mouth
  - location: Kama
  - coordinates: 56°49′17″N 53°54′22″E
- Length: 206 km (128 mi)
- Basin size: 4,870 km^{2} (1,880 sq mi)

Basin features
- Progression: Kama→ Volga→ Caspian Sea

The Siva (Russian: Сива) is a river in Udmurt Republic and Perm Krai in Russia, a right-bank tributary of the Kama. The river is 206 kilometres (128 mi) long, and its drainage basin covers 4,870 square kilometres (1,880 mi^{2}). It starts in the Chastinsky District, near the village of Pikhtovka. Then it flows through the Bolshesosnovsky District of Perm Krai and the Votkinsky District of Udmurtia. Its mouth is downstream of the dam of Votkinsk Hydroelectric Station. The Siva freezes up in the second half of October and remains icebound until April.

== Main tributaries ==
- Left: only small insignificant rivers;
- Right: But, Sosnovka, Chyornaya, Lyp, Votka.
