= Krasny Oktyabr (engine plant) =

Russian engine plant

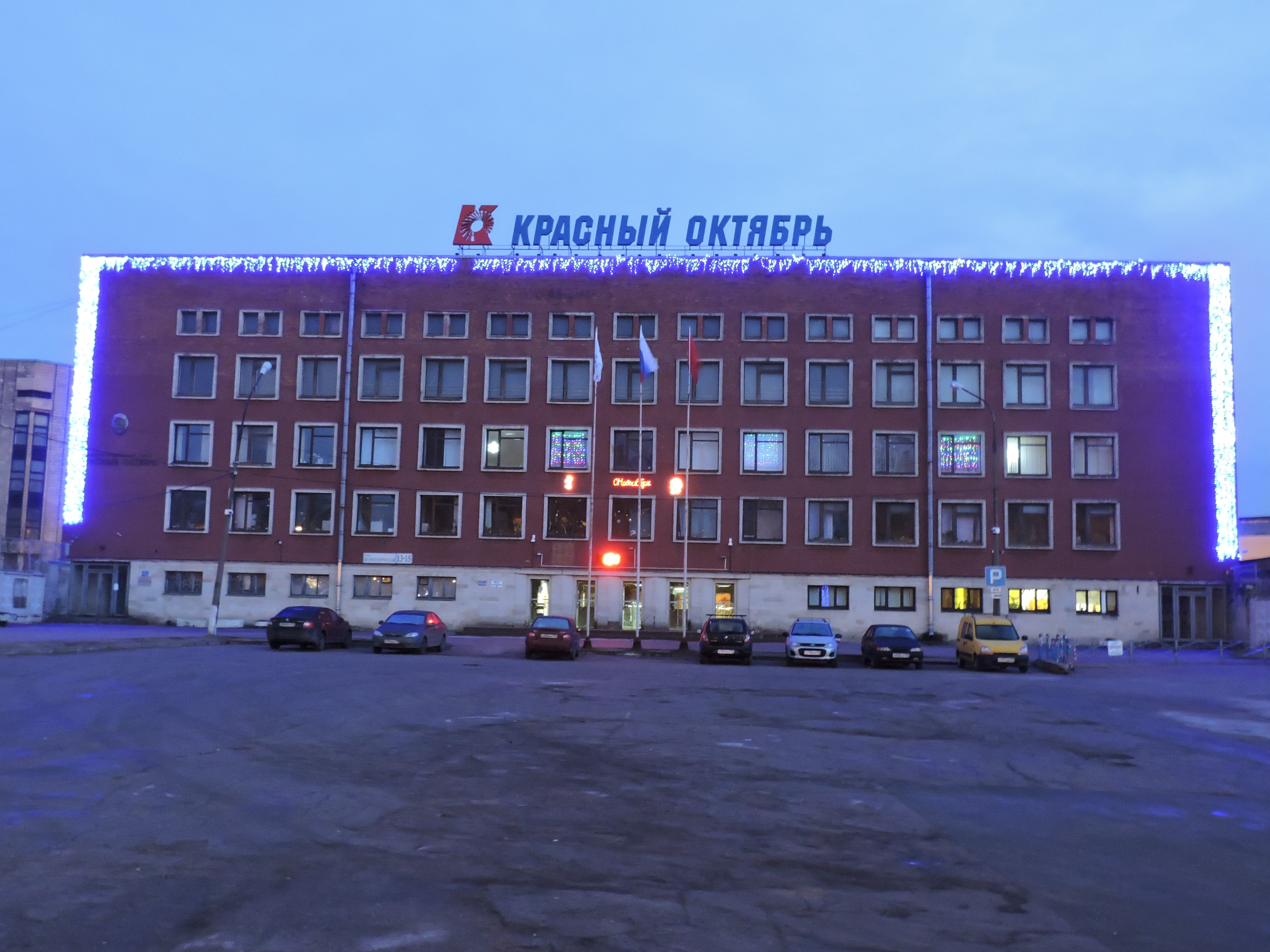
- Krasny Oktyabr engine plant
- Founded: 1891
- Headquarters: Saint Petersburg, Russia
- Revenue: $174 million (2017)
- Operating income: $47.4 million (2017)
- Net income: $39 million (2017)
- Total assets: $269 million (2017)
- Total equity: $205 million (2017)

Krasny Oktyabr Machine-Building Enterprise (Russian: ОАО «Красный Октябрь») is a company based in Saint Petersburg, Russia.

The Red October Machine-Building Enterprise is a major producer of helicopter engines and components, as well as being the only producer of helicopter engine transmissions in the former USSR. It also has produced fighter jet engines and rocket engines.
