= Kozhino, Kolchuginsky District, Vladimir Oblast =

Kozhino Кожино
- Village
- Location within Vladimir Oblast Location within Russia
- Coordinates: 56°21′N 39°13′E
- Country: Russia
- Region: Vladimir Oblast
- District: Kolchuginsky District
- Time zone: UTC+3:00

Kozhino (Russian: Кожино) is a rural locality (a village) in Florishchinskoye Rural Settlement, Kolchuginsky District, Vladimir Oblast, Russia. The population was 5 as of 2010.

== Geography ==
Kozhino is located 13 km northwest of Kolchugino (the district's administrative centre) by road. Metallist is the nearest rural locality.
