= Medvedevo, Lukhsky District, Ivanovo Oblast =

Medvedevo Медведево
- Village
- Location within Ivanovo Oblast Location within Russia
- Coordinates: 57°03′N 42°36′E
- Country: Russia
- Region: Ivanovo Oblast
- District: Lukhsky District
- Time zone: UTC+3:00

Medvedevo (Russian: Медведево) is a rural locality (a village) in Lukhsky District, Ivanovo Oblast, Russia. Population: 7 (2010 census);

== Geography ==
This rural locality is located 22 kilometres (14 mi) from Lukh (the district's administrative centre), 100 kilometres (62 mi) from Ivanovo (capital of Ivanovo Oblast) and 335 kilometres (208 mi) from Moscow. Bolshoye Pervunino is the nearest rural locality.
