= Medvedevo, Totemsky District, Vologda Oblast =

Medvedevo Медведево
- Village
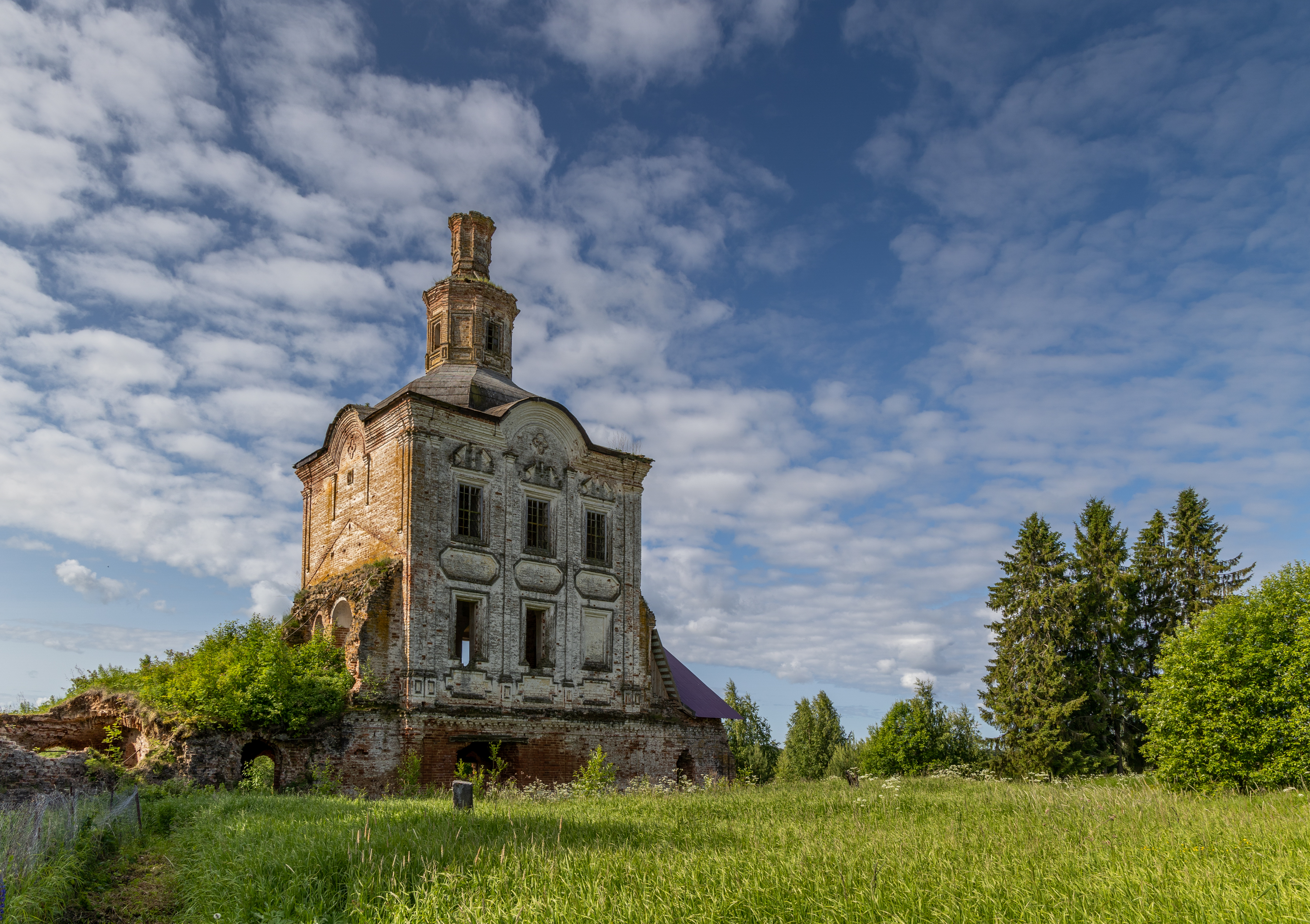
- Medvedevo in 2023

- Location within Vologda Oblast Location within Russia
- Coordinates: 60°01′N 43°01′E
- Country: Russia
- Region: Vologda Oblast
- District: Totemsky District
- Time zone: UTC+3:00

Medvedevo (Russian: Медведево) is a rural locality (a village) in Medvedevskoye Rural Settlement, Totemsky District, Vologda Oblast, Russia. The population was 153 as of 2002.

== Geography ==
Medvedevo is located 19 km northeast of Totma (the district's administrative centre) by road. Filinskaya is the nearest rural locality.
