= Medvedevo, Mari El Republic =

Medvedevo Медведево
- Urban-type settlement

Other transcription(s)
  - Meadow Mari: Маскасола
- Interactive map of Medvedevo
- Location of Medvedevo Medvedevo (Mari El)
- Coordinates: 56°38′N 47°49′E
- Country: Russia
- Federal subject: Mari El
- Administrative district: Medvedevsky District
- Urban-type settlementSelsoviet: Medvedevo Urban-Type Settlement
- Founded: 17th century
- Elevation: 115 m (377 ft)

Population (2010 Census)
  - Total: 16,841
  - Estimate (2025): 22,555 (+33.9%)

Administrative status
  - Capital of: Medvedevsky District, Medvedevo Urban-Type Settlement

Municipal status
  - Municipal district: Medvedevsky Municipal District
  - Urban settlement: Medvedevo Urban Settlement
  - Capital of: Medvedevsky Municipal District, Medvedevo Urban Settlement
- Time zone: UTC+3 (MSK)
- Postal codes: 425200, 425239
- Dialing code: +7 8362
- OKTMO ID: 88628151051

Medvedevo population
- 2010 Census: 16,841
- 2002 Census: 16,610
- 1989 Census: 13,591
- 1979 Census: 9,684

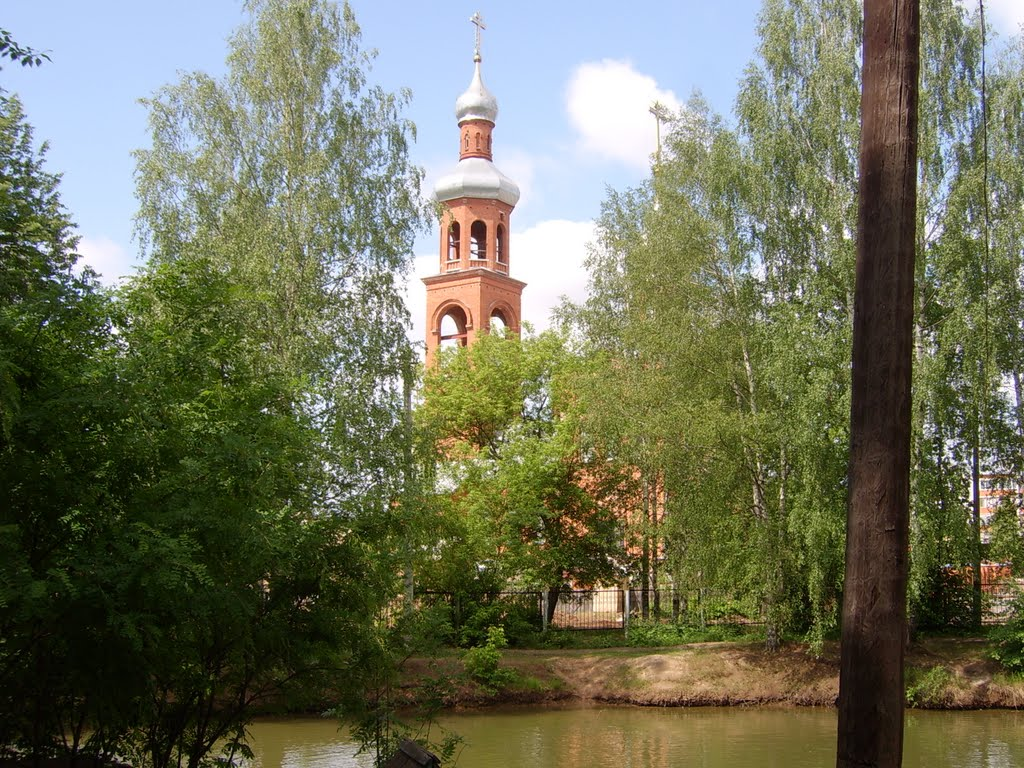
A church in Medvedevo

Medvedevo (Russian: Медве́дево; Meadow Mari: Маскасола, Maskasola) is an urban locality (an urban-type settlement) and the administrative center of Medvedevsky District of the Mari El Republic, Russia. As of the 2010 Census, its population was 16,841.

== Administrative and municipal status ==
Within the framework of administrative divisions, Medvedevo serves as the administrative center of Medvedevsky District. As an administrative division, the urban-type settlement of Medvedevo is incorporated within Medvedevsky District as Medvedevo Urban-Type Settlement (an administrative division of the district). As a municipal division, Medvedevo Urban-Type Settlement is incorporated within Medvedevsky Municipal District as Medvedevo Urban Settlement.
