= Krasny Oktyabr, Belgorod Oblast =

Krasny Oktyabr Красный Октябрь
- Selo
- Location within Belgorod Oblast Location within Russia
- Coordinates: 50°27′N 36°20′E
- Country: Russia
- Region: Belgorod Oblast
- District: Belgorodsky District
- Time zone: UTC+3:00

Krasny Oktyabr (Russian: Красный Октябрь) is a rural locality (a selo) and the administrative center of Krasnooktyabrskoye Rural Settlement, Belgorodsky District, Belgorod Oblast, Russia. The population was 2,550 as of 2010. There are 30 streets.
