= Medvedevo, Volgograd Oblast =

Medvedevo Медведево
- Selo
- Location within Volgograd Oblast Location within Russia
- Coordinates: 50°29′N 44°28′E
- Country: Russia
- Region: Volgograd Oblast
- District: Danilovsky District
- Time zone: UTC+4:00

Medvedevo (Russian: Медведево) is a rural locality (a selo) in Orekhovskoye Rural Settlement, Danilovsky District, Volgograd Oblast, Russia. The population was 3 as of 2010. There are 2 streets.

== Geography ==
Medvedevo is located in steppe, on the right bank of the Medveditsa River, 53 km northeast of Danilovka (the district's administrative centre) by road. Tarasov is the nearest rural locality.
