= Krasnyi Oktiabr =

Krasnyi Oktiabr is an abolished toponym in Ukraine. Settlements that formerly used the name include:

- Lypske, Donetsk Oblast
- Maiorove, Donetsk Oblast
