= Medvedevo, Teykovsky District, Ivanovo Oblast =

Medvedevo Медведево
- Village
- Location within Ivanovo Oblast Location within Russia
- Coordinates: 56°41′N 40°19′E
- Country: Russia
- Region: Ivanovo Oblast
- District: Teykovsky District
- Time zone: UTC+3:00

Medvedevo (Russian: Медведево) is a rural locality (a village) in Teykovsky District, Ivanovo Oblast, Russia. Population: 8 (2010 census);

== Geography ==
This rural locality is located 22 kilometres (14 mi) from Teykovo (the district's administrative centre), 51 kilometres (32 mi) from Ivanovo (capital of Ivanovo Oblast) and 195 kilometres (121 mi) from Moscow. Yasnovo is the nearest rural locality.
