= Medvedevo, Vladimir Oblast =

Medvedevo Медведево
- Village
- Location within Vladimir Oblast Location within Russia
- Coordinates: 55°58′N 42°03′E
- Country: Russia
- Region: Vladimir Oblast
- District: Vyaznikovsky District
- Time zone: UTC+3:00

Medvedevo (Russian: Медведево) is a rural locality (a village) in Paustovskoye Rural Settlement, Vyaznikovsky District, Vladimir Oblast, Russia. The population was 99 as of 2010.

== Geography ==
Medvedevo is located 40 km south of Vyazniki (the district's administrative centre) by road. Sergiyevy-Gorki is the nearest rural locality.
