= Krasnooktyabrskoye, Republic of Dagestan =

Krasnooktyabrskoye Краснооктябрьское
- Selo
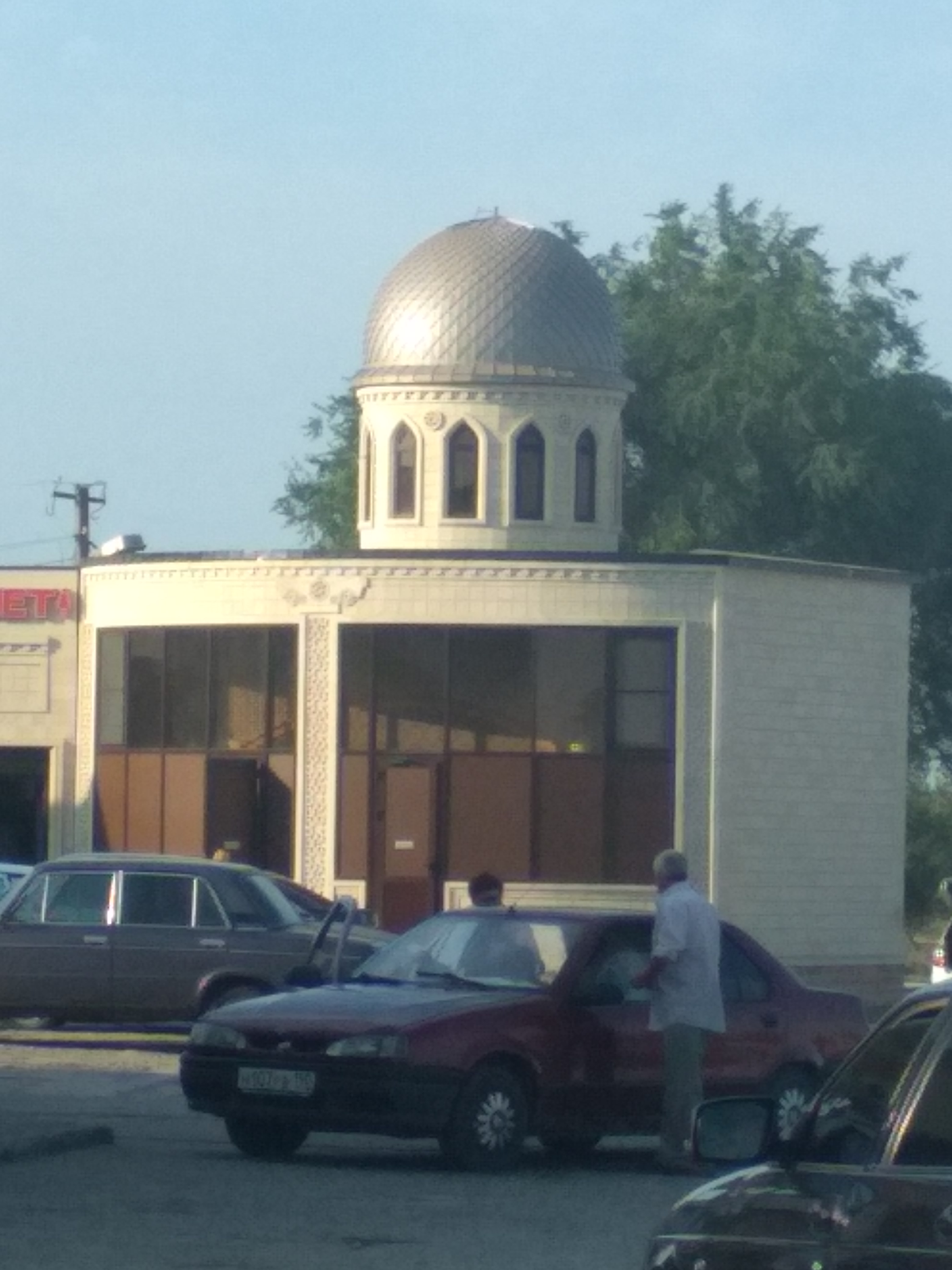
- Street in Krasnooktyabrskoye

- Location within Republic of Dagestan Location within Russia
- Coordinates: 43°50′N 46°39′E
- Country: Russia
- Region: Republic of Dagestan
- District: Kizlyarsky District
- Time zone: UTC+3:00

Krasnooktyabrskoye (Russian: Краснооктябрьское) is a rural locality (a selo) in Novokokhanovsky Selsoviet, Kizlyarsky District, Republic of Dagestan, Russia. The population was 1,807 as of 2010. There are 11 streets.

== Geography ==
Krasnooktyabrskoye is located 7 km southwest of Kizlyar (the district's administrative centre) by road. Novokokhanovskoye and Krasny Voskhod are the nearest rural localities.

== Nationalities ==
Avars, Dargins, Russians, Lezgins and Tabasarans live there.
