= Krasnooktyabrsky, Mari El Republic =

Krasnooktyabrsky Краснооктябрьский
- Urban-type settlement
- Interactive map of Krasnooktyabrsky
- Location of Krasnooktyabrsky Krasnooktyabrsky (Mari El)
- Coordinates: 56°41′N 47°40′E
- Country: Russia
- Federal subject: Mari El
- Administrative district: Medvedevsky District
- Urban-type settlementSelsoviet: Krasnooktyabrsky Urban-Type Settlement
- Founded: 1931

Population (2010 Census)
  - Total: 4,559
  - Estimate (2023): 3,546 (−22.2%)

Administrative status
  - Capital of: Krasnooktyabrsky Urban-Type Settlement

Municipal status
  - Municipal district: Medvedevsky Municipal District
  - Urban settlement: Krasnooktyabrsky Urban Settlement
  - Capital of: Krasnooktyabrsky Urban Settlement
- Time zone: UTC+3 (MSK)
- Postal code: 425202
- OKTMO ID: 88628160051

Krasnooktyabrsky population
- 2010 Census: 4,559
- 2002 Census: 4,307
- 1989 Census: 4,479
- 1979 Census: 3,809

Krasnooktyabrsky (Russian: Краснооктя́брьский) is an urban locality (an urban-type settlement) in Medvedevsky District of the Mari El Republic, Russia. As of the 2010 Census its population was 4,559.

It is located 9 km northwest of Medvedevo, Nolka railway station.

An arsenal of the Russian Armed Forces is located in the town.

== Administrative and municipal status ==
Within the framework of administrative divisions, the urban-type settlement of Krasnooktyabrsky is incorporated within Medvedevsky District as Krasnooktyabrsky Urban-Type Settlement (an administrative division of the district). As a municipal division, Krasnooktyabrsky Urban-Type Settlement is incorporated within Medvedevsky Municipal District as Krasnooktyabrsky Urban Settlement.
