= Medvedevsky District =

Medvedevsky District Медведевский район (Russian)
- District

Other transcription(s)
  - Meadow Mari: Маскасола кундем
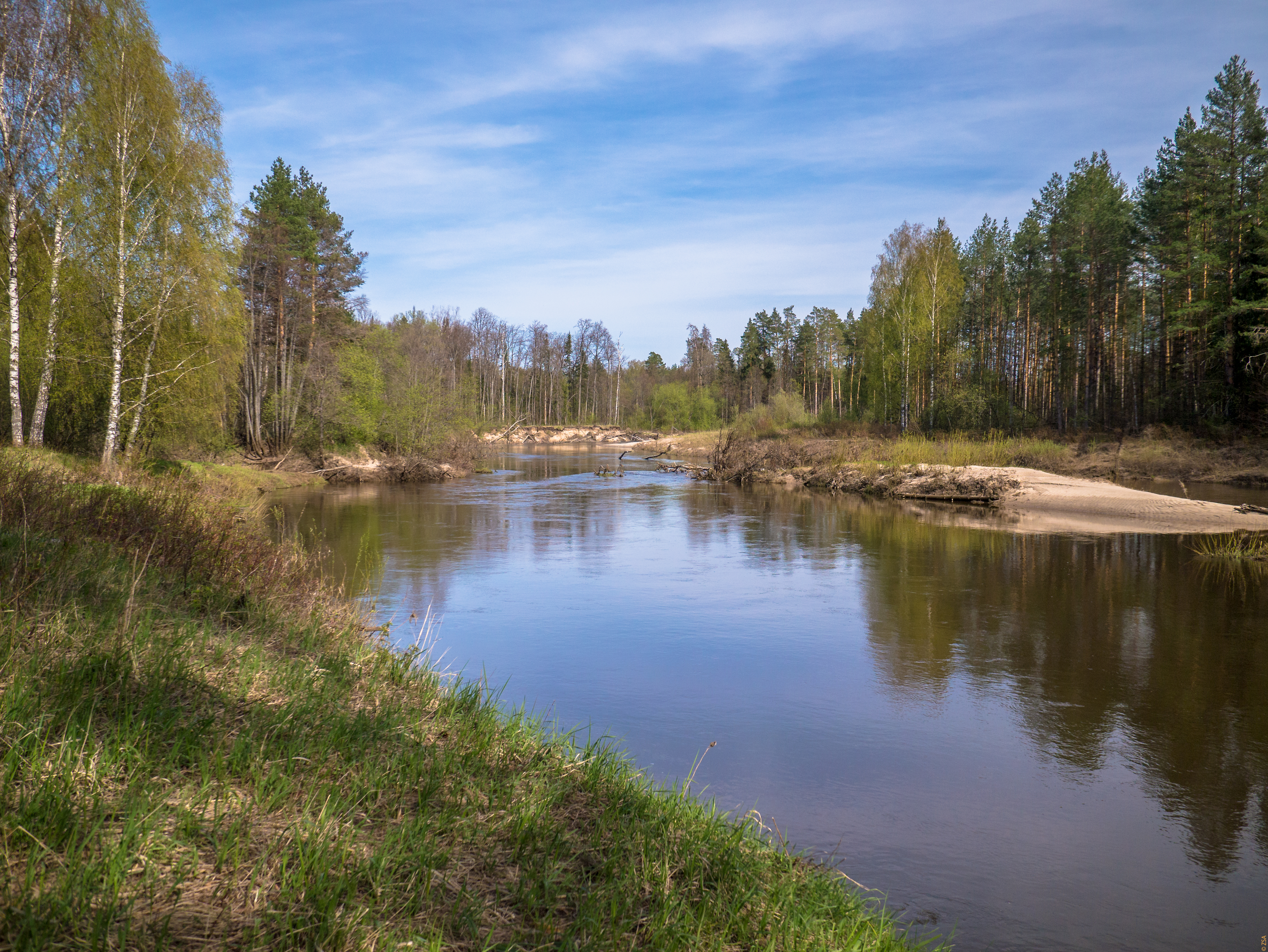
- In Ustye-Kundyshsky zakaznik, a protected area of Russia in Medvedevsky District

- Flag Coat of arms
- Location of Medvedevsky District in the Mari El Republic
- Coordinates: 56.666°N 47.216°E
- Country: Russia
- Federal subject: Mari El Republic
- Established: 6 December 1943
- Administrative center: Medvedevo

Area
  - Total: 2,800 km^{2} (1,100 sq mi)

Population (2010 Census)
  - Total: 67,703
  - Density: 24/km^{2} (63/sq mi)
  - Urban: 31.6%
  - Rural: 68.4%

Administrative structure
  - Administrative divisions: 2 Urban-type settlements, 16 Rural okrugs
  - Inhabited localities: 2 urban-type settlements, 158 rural localities

Municipal structure
  - Municipally incorporated as: Medvedevsky Municipal District
  - Municipal divisions: 2 urban settlements, 16 rural settlements
- Time zone: UTC+3 (MSK)
- OKTMO ID: 88628000
- Website: http://www.medvedevo12.ru

Population of Medvedevsky District
- 2010 Census: 67,703
- 2002 Census: 53,848
- 1989 Census: 52,285
- 1979 Census: 47,850

Medvedevsky District (Russian: Медве́девский райо́н; Meadow Mari: Маскасола кундем, Maskasola kundem) is an administrative and municipal district (raion), one of the fourteen in the Mari El Republic, Russia. It is located in the central and northern parts of the republic. The area of the district is 2,800 square kilometers (1,100 sq mi). Its administrative center is the urban locality (an urban-type settlement) of Medvedevo. As of the 2010 Census, the total population of the district was 67,703, with the population of Medvedevo accounting for 24.9% of that number.

== Administrative and municipal status ==
Within the framework of administrative divisions, Medvedevsky District is one of the fourteen in the republic. It is divided into 2 urban-type settlements (administrative divisions with the administrative centers in the urban-type settlements (inhabited localities) of Krasnooktyabrsky and Medvedevo) and 16 rural okrugs, all of which comprise 158 rural localities. As a municipal division, the district is incorporated as Medvedevsky Municipal District. The two urban-type settlements are incorporated into two urban settlements, and the sixteen rural okrugs are incorporated into sixteen rural settlements within the municipal district. The urban-type settlement of Medvedevo serves as the administrative center of both the administrative and municipal district.

== Notable residents ==
- Vladislav Vinogradov (1899–1962), Soviet military leader, born in Kuznetsovo
