= Bolshaya Sosnova =

Rural locality in Bolshesosnovsky District, Perm Krai, Russia

Coordinates: 57°40′24″N 54°36′06″E

Bolshaya Sosnova (Russian: Большая Соснова) is a rural locality (a selo) and the administrative center of Bolshesosnovsky District of Perm Krai, Russia, located 134 kilometers (83 mi) southwest from Perm. Population: 4,432 (2010 census); 4,406 (2002 census); 4,043 (1989 Soviet census).

== History ==
It was first mentioned in 1716. In the 18th century, it was a postal station on the Siberian Route. In the 19th century, it was called Sosnovskoye. It became the administrative center of a district in 1924, and has since served in this capacity with a brief interruption between 1963 and 1968.
