= Bolshesosnovsky District =

Bolshesosnovsky District Большесосновский район (Russian)
- District
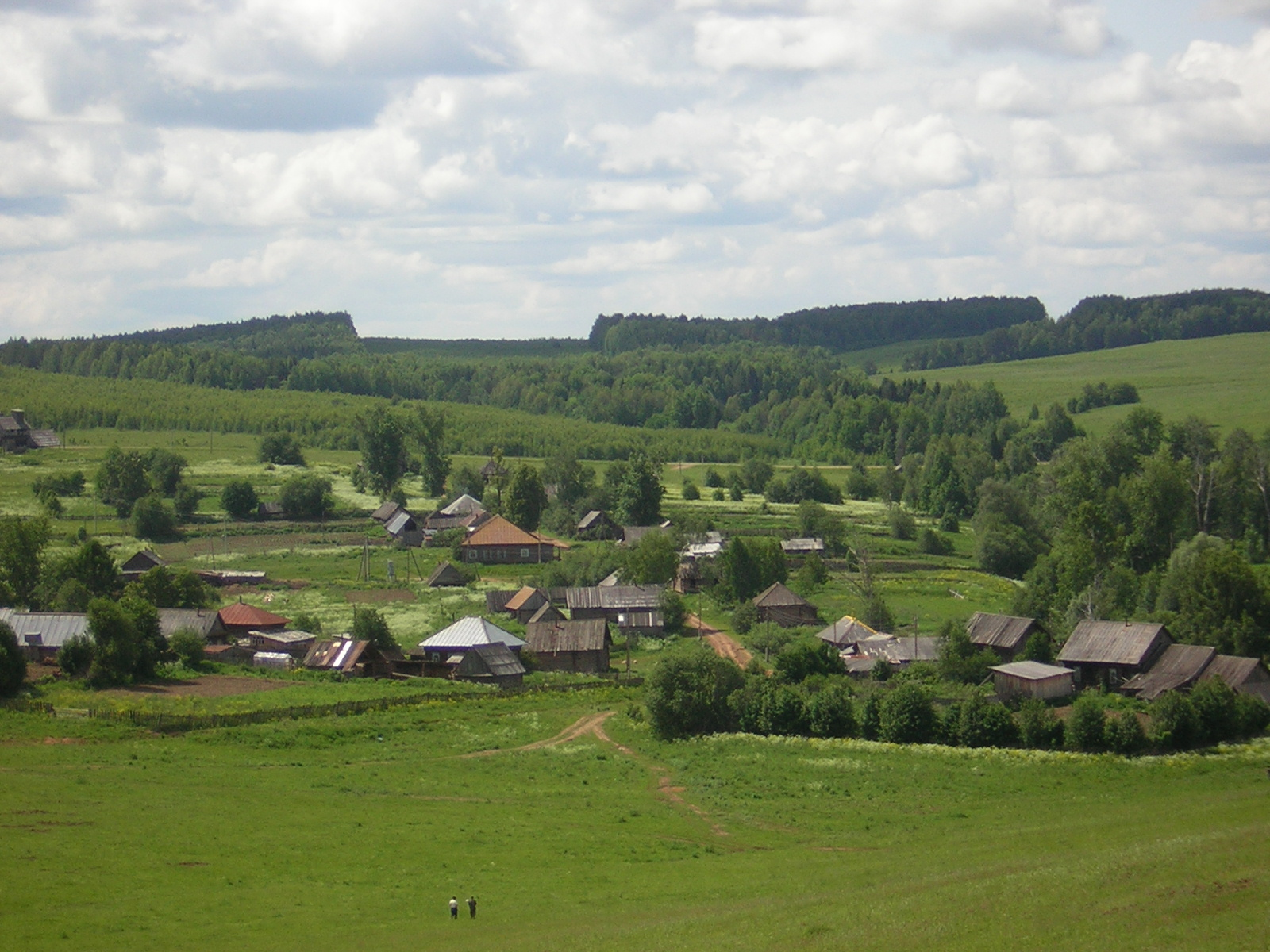

- Flag Coat of arms
- Location of Bolshesosnovsky District in Perm Krai
- Coordinates: 57.542°N 53.898°E
- Country: Russia
- Federal subject: Perm Krai
- Established: March 18, 1924
- Administrative center: Bolshaya Sosnova

Area
  - Total: 2,220 km^{2} (860 sq mi)

Population (2010 Census)
  - Total: 13,215
  - Density: 5.95/km^{2} (15.4/sq mi)
  - Urban: 0%
  - Rural: 100%

Administrative structure
  - Inhabited localities: 62 rural localities

Municipal structure
  - Municipally incorporated as: Bolshesosnovsky Municipal District
  - Municipal divisions: 0 urban settlements, 7 rural settlements
- Time zone: UTC+5 (MSK+2)
- OKTMO ID: 57608000
- Website: http://bsosnovsky.ru/

Bolshesosnovsky District (Russian: Большесосно́вский райо́н) is an administrative district (raion) of Perm Krai, Russia; one of the thirty-three in the krai. Municipally, it is incorporated as Bolshesosnovsky Municipal District. It is located in the southwest of the krai. The area of the district is 2,220 square kilometers (860 sq mi). Its administrative center is the rural locality (a selo) of Bolshaya Sosnova. Population: 13,215 (2010 Census); 15,295 (2002 Census); 16,955 (1989 Soviet census). The population of Bolshaya Sosnova accounts for 33.5% of the district's total population.

== Geography ==
The main rivers of the district are the Siva with its tributaries the Sosnovka and the Chyornaya. About 32% of the district's territory is covered by forests—one of the lowest rates in the krai.

== History ==
The district was established on March 18, 1924. In 1963, the district was abolished and split between Chastinsky and Ochyorsky Districts. In December 1968, the district was restored.

== Economy ==
The economy of the district is based on agriculture, which accounts for about 81% of the total district's GDP.

== Demographics ==
The most numerous ethnic groups, according to the 2002 Census, include Russians at 92.9%, Udmurts at 2.4%, and Tatars at 1.3%.

== See also ==
- Zabolotovo
- Zachernaya
- Zagibovka

== Sources ==
- Законодательное собрание Пермской области. Закон №416-67 от 28 февраля 1996 г. «Об административно-территориальном устройстве Пермского края», в ред. Закона №504-ПК от 9 июля 2015 г. «О внесении изменений в Закон Пермской области "Об административно-территориальном устройстве Пермского края"». Вступил в силу с момента опубликования. Опубликован: "Звезда", №38, 12 марта 1996 г. (Legislative Assembly of Perm Oblast. Law #416-67 of February 28, 1996 On the Administrative-Territorial Structure of Perm Krai, as amended by the Law #504-PK of July 9, 2015 On Amending the Law of Perm Oblast "On the Administrative-Territorial Structure of Perm Krai". Effective as of the moment of publication.).
- Законодательное собрание Пермской области. Закон №1880-408 от 9 декабря 2004 г. «Об утверждении границ и о наделении статусом муниципальных образований Большесосновского района Пермского края», в ред. Закона №328-ПК от 7 июня 2014 г. «О внесении изменений в отдельные Законы Пермской области и Коми-Пермяцкого автономного округа». Вступил в силу через десять дней со дня официального опубликования. Опубликован: "Бюллетень Законодательного Собрания и администрации Пермской области", №1, II часть, 27 января 2005 г. (Legislative Assembly of Perm Oblast. Law #1880-408 of December 9, 2004 On Establishing the Borders and on Granting the Status to the Municipal Formations of Bolshesosnovsky District of Perm Krai, as amended by the Law #328-PK of June 7, 2014 On Amending Various Laws of Perm Oblast and Komi-Permyak Autonomous Okrug. Effective as of the day which is ten days following the day of the official publication.).
