= Yelkhovka =

Yelkhovka (Russian: Елховка) is the name of several rural localities in Russia.

== Ivanovo Oblast ==
As of 2010, one rural locality in Ivanovo Oblast bears this name:

- Yelkhovka, Ivanovo Oblast, a selo in Teykovsky District

== Nizhny Novgorod Oblast ==
As of 2010, nine rural localities in Nizhny Novgorod Oblast bear this name:

- Yelkhovka, Tarasikhinsky Selsoviet, Semyonov, Nizhny Novgorod Oblast, a village in Tarasikhinsky Selsoviet of the town of oblast significance of Semyonov
- Yelkhovka, Sukhobezvodnoye, Semyonov, Nizhny Novgorod Oblast, a village under the administrative jurisdiction of the work settlement of Sukhobezvodnoye under the administrative jurisdiction of the town of oblast significance of Semyonov
- Yelkhovka, Pervomaysk, Nizhny Novgorod Oblast, a village under the administrative jurisdiction of the town of oblast significance of Pervomaysk
- Yelkhovka, Kstovsky District, Nizhny Novgorod Oblast, a selo in Bolshemokrinsky Selsoviet of Kstovsky District
- Yelkhovka, Lyskovsky District, Nizhny Novgorod Oblast, a selo in Berendeyevsky Selsoviet of Lyskovsky District
- Yelkhovka, Shatkovsky District, Nizhny Novgorod Oblast, a selo in Svetlogorsky Selsoviet of Shatkovsky District
- Yelkhovka, Spassky District, Nizhny Novgorod Oblast, a selo in Spassky Selsoviet of Spassky District
- Yelkhovka, Tonkinsky District, Nizhny Novgorod Oblast, a village under the administrative jurisdiction of the work settlement of Tonkino in Tonkinsky District
- Yelkhovka, Vadsky District, Nizhny Novgorod Oblast, a selo in Kruto-Maydansky Selsoviet of Vadsky District

== Orenburg Oblast ==
As of 2010, two rural localities in Orenburg Oblast bear this name:

- Yelkhovka, Buzuluksky District, Orenburg Oblast, a selo in Yelkhovsky Selsoviet of Buzuluksky District
- Yelkhovka, Totsky District, Orenburg Oblast, a selo in Zlobinsky Selsoviet of Totsky District

== Samara Oblast ==
As of 2010, three rural localities in Samara Oblast bear this name:

- Yelkhovka, Borsky District, Samara Oblast, a settlement in Borsky District
- Yelkhovka, Sergiyevsky District, Samara Oblast, a selo in Sergiyevsky District
- Yelkhovka, Yelkhovsky District, Samara Oblast, a selo in Yelkhovsky District

== Saratov Oblast ==
As of 2010, four rural localities in Saratov Oblast bear this name:

- Yelkhovka, Khvalynsky District, Saratov Oblast, a selo in Khvalynsky District
- Yelkhovka, Novoburassky District, Saratov Oblast, a village in Novoburassky District
- Yelkhovka, Petrovsky District, Saratov Oblast, a village in Petrovsky District
- Yelkhovka, Volsky District, Saratov Oblast, a selo in Volsky District

== Republic of Tatarstan ==
As of 2010, one rural locality in the Republic of Tatarstan bears this name:

- Yelkhovka, Republic of Tatarstan, a village in Bugulminsky District

== Ulyanovsk Oblast ==
As of 2010, one rural locality in Ulyanovsk Oblast bears this name:

- Yelkhovka, Ulyanovsk Oblast, a selo in Sarsky Rural Okrug of Sursky District

== Vladimir Oblast ==
As of 2010, one rural locality in Vladimir Oblast bears this name:

- Yelkhovka, Vladimir Oblast, a village in Sobinsky District

== Vologda Oblast ==
As of 2010, two rural localities in Vologda Oblast bear this name:

- Yelkhovka, Gryazovetsky District, Vologda Oblast, a village in Vokhtogsky Selsoviet of Gryazovetsky District
- Yelkhovka, Nikolsky District, Vologda Oblast, a village in Niginsky Selsoviet of Nikolsky District
