= Melyushevo =

Melyushevo Мелюшево
- Village
- Location within Ivanovo Oblast Location within Russia
- Coordinates: 56°51′N 40°25′E
- Country: Russia
- Region: Ivanovo Oblast
- District: Teykovsky District
- Time zone: UTC+3:00

Melyushevo (Russian: Мелюшево) is a rural locality (a village) in Teykovsky District, Ivanovo Oblast, Russia. Population: 94 (2010 census);

== Geography ==
This rural locality is located 7 kilometres (4.3 mi) from Teykovo (the district's administrative centre), 37 kilometres (23 mi) from Ivanovo (capital of Ivanovo Oblast) and 210 kilometres (130 mi) from Moscow. Pyaty Uchastok Teykovskogo Torfopredpriyatiya is the nearest rural locality.
