= Yarishnevo =

Yarishnevo Яришнево
- Village
- Location within Ivanovo Oblast Location within Russia
- Coordinates: 56°44′N 40°13′E
- Country: Russia
- Region: Ivanovo Oblast
- District: Teykovsky District
- Time zone: UTC+3:00

Yarishnevo (Russian: Яришнево) is a rural locality (a village) in Teykovsky District, Ivanovo Oblast, Russia. Population: 25 (2010 census);

== Geography ==
This rural locality is located 22 kilometres (14 mi) from Teykovo (the district's administrative centre), 53 kilometres (33 mi) from Ivanovo (capital of Ivanovo Oblast) and 193 kilometres (120 mi) from Moscow. Moskvino is the nearest rural locality.
