= Pelgusovo =

Pelgusovo Пелгусово
- Village
- Location within Ivanovo Oblast Location within Russia
- Coordinates: 56°56′N 40°42′E
- Country: Russia
- Region: Ivanovo Oblast
- District: Teykovsky District
- Time zone: UTC+3:00

Pelgusovo (Russian: Пелгусово) is a rural locality (a village) in Teykovsky District, Ivanovo Oblast, Russia. Population: 35 (2010 census);

== Geography ==
This rural locality is located 15 kilometres (9.3 mi) from Teykovo (the district's administrative centre), 16 kilometres (9.9 mi) from Ivanovo (capital of Ivanovo Oblast) and 230 kilometres (140 mi) from Moscow. Klintsevo is the nearest rural locality.
