= Burakovo, Teykovsky District, Ivanovo Oblast =

Burakovo Бураково
- Village
- Location within Ivanovo Oblast Location within Russia
- Coordinates: 56°49′N 40°38′E
- Country: Russia
- Region: Ivanovo Oblast
- District: Teykovsky District
- Time zone: UTC+3:00

Burakovo (Russian: Бураково) is a rural locality (a village) in Teykovsky District, Ivanovo Oblast, Russia. Population: 21 (2010 census);

== Geography ==
This rural locality is located 7 kilometres (4.3 mi) from Teykovo (the district's administrative centre), 27 kilometres (17 mi) from Ivanovo (capital of Ivanovo Oblast) and 219 kilometres (136 mi) from Moscow. Maly Takovets is the nearest rural locality.
