= Derevnya-Ivan =

Derevnya-Ivan Деревня-Иван
- Village
- Location within Ivanovo Oblast Location within Russia
- Coordinates: 56°38′N 40°25′E
- Country: Russia
- Region: Ivanovo Oblast
- District: Teykovsky District
- Time zone: UTC+3:00

Derevnya-Ivan (Russian: Деревня-Иван) is a rural locality (a village) in Teykovsky District, Ivanovo Oblast, Russia. Population: 14 (2010 census);

== Geography ==
This rural locality is located 24 kilometres (15 mi) from Teykovo (the district's administrative centre), 51 kilometres (32 mi) from Ivanovo (capital of Ivanovo Oblast) and 198 kilometres (123 mi) from Moscow. Gari is the nearest rural locality.
