= Doronino, Ivanovo Oblast =

Doronino Доронино
- Village
- Location within Ivanovo Oblast Location within Russia
- Coordinates: 56°58′N 40°38′E
- Country: Russia
- Region: Ivanovo Oblast
- District: Teykovsky District
- Time zone: UTC+3:00

Doronino (Russian: Доронино) is a rural locality (a village) in Teykovsky District, Ivanovo Oblast, Russia. Population: 25 (2010 census);

== Geography ==
This rural locality is located 14 kilometres (8.7 mi) from Teykovo (the district's administrative centre), 20 kilometres (12 mi) from Ivanovo (capital of Ivanovo Oblast) and 227 kilometres (141 mi) from Moscow. Rozhstvo is the nearest rural locality.
