= Aleksandrovich =

Aleksandrovich (also Alexandrovich) is a Russian-language patronymic and surname. The surname corresponds to the Polish surname Aleksandrowicz/Alexandrowicz and the Serbian surname Aleksandrović. Notable people with the surname include:

- Aleksandr Aleksandrovich Ilyin (born 1983), Russian actor
- Aleksandr Aleksandrovich Karelin (born 1967), Russian politician
- Aleksei Aleksandrovich Balandin (1898–1967), Soviet chemist
- Alyaksandr Aleksandrovich (born 1997), Belarusian footballer
- Boris Aleksandrovich Pelikan (1861–1931), Ukrainian politician
- Mikhail Alexandrovich (1914–2002), Latvian tenor, and cantor
- Nikolai Aleksandrovich, multiple people
- Pyotr Aleksandrovich Valuyev (1815–1890), Russian statesman
- Vladimir Aleksandrovich Demidov (born 1964), Russian footballer
- Mikhail Aleksandrovich Sholokhov
