= Berlovo =

Berlovo Берлово
- Village
- Location within Ivanovo Oblast Location within Russia
- Coordinates: 56°53′N 40°41′E
- Country: Russia
- Region: Ivanovo Oblast
- District: Teykovsky District
- Time zone: UTC+3:00

Berlovo (Russian: Берлово) is a rural locality (a village) in Teykovsky District, Ivanovo Oblast, Russia. Population: 6 (2010 census);

== Geography ==
This rural locality is located 10 kilometres (6.2 mi) from Teykovo (the district's administrative centre), 21 kilometres (13 mi) from Ivanovo (capital of Ivanovo Oblast) and 225 kilometres (140 mi) from Moscow. Fedino is the nearest rural locality.
