= Sitnikovo, Teykovsky District =

Sitnikovo Ситниково
- Village
- Location within Ivanovo Oblast Location within Russia
- Coordinates: 56°55′N 40°42′E
- Country: Russia
- Region: Ivanovo Oblast
- District: Teykovsky District
- Time zone: UTC+3:00

Sitnikovo (Russian: Ситниково) is a rural locality (a village) in Teykovsky District, Ivanovo Oblast, Russia. Population: 11 (2010 census);

== Geography ==
This rural locality is located 13 kilometres (8.1 mi) from Teykovo (the district's administrative centre), 18 kilometres (11 mi) from Ivanovo (capital of Ivanovo Oblast) and 228 kilometres (142 mi) from Moscow. Bolshoye Stupkino is the nearest rural locality.
