= Stebachyovo =

Stebachyovo Стебачёво
- Village
- Location within Ivanovo Oblast Location within Russia
- Coordinates: 56°39′N 40°19′E
- Country: Russia
- Region: Ivanovo Oblast
- District: Teykovsky District
- Time zone: UTC+3:00

Stebachyovo (Russian: Стебачёво) is a rural locality (a selo) in Teykovsky District, Ivanovo Oblast, Russia. Population: 28 (2010 census);

== Geography ==
This rural locality is located 25 kilometres (16 mi) from Teykovo (the district's administrative centre), 54 kilometres (34 mi) from Ivanovo (capital of Ivanovo Oblast) and 193 kilometres (120 mi) from Moscow. Petrovsky is the nearest rural locality.
