= Kharino, Teykovsky District =

Kharino Харино
- Village
- Location within Ivanovo Oblast Location within Russia
- Coordinates: 56°39′N 40°24′E
- Country: Russia
- Region: Ivanovo Oblast
- District: Teykovsky District
- Time zone: UTC+3:00

Kharino (Russian: Харино) is a rural locality (a village) in Teykovsky District, Ivanovo Oblast, Russia. Population: 60 (2010 census);

== Geography ==
This rural locality is located 23 kilometres (14 mi) from Teykovo (the district's administrative centre), 50 kilometres (31 mi) from Ivanovo (capital of Ivanovo Oblast) and 198 kilometres (123 mi) from Moscow. Nerl is the nearest rural locality.
