= Zolotnikovskaya Pustyn =

Zolotnikovskaya Pustyn Золотниковская Пустынь
- Village
- Location within Ivanovo Oblast Location within Russia
- Coordinates: 56°41′N 40°36′E
- Country: Russia
- Region: Ivanovo Oblast
- District: Teykovsky District
- Time zone: UTC+3:00

Zolotnikovskaya Pustyn (Russian: Золотниковская Пустынь) is a rural locality (a selo) in Teykovsky District, Ivanovo Oblast, Russia. Population: 16 (2010 census);

== Geography ==
This rural locality is located 19 kilometres (12 mi) from Teykovo (the district's administrative centre), 40 kilometres (25 mi) from Ivanovo (capital of Ivanovo Oblast) and 210 kilometres (130 mi) from Moscow. Dashkovo is the nearest rural locality.
