= Myasnikovo, Teykovsky District =

Myasnikovo Мясниково
- Village
- Location within Ivanovo Oblast Location within Russia
- Coordinates: 56°59′N 40°37′E
- Country: Russia
- Region: Ivanovo Oblast
- District: Teykovsky District
- Time zone: UTC+3:00

Myasnikovo (Russian: Мясниково) is a rural locality (a village) in Teykovsky District, Ivanovo Oblast, Russia. Population: 6 (2010 census);

== Geography ==
This rural locality is located 17 kilometres (11 mi) from Teykovo (the district's administrative centre), 20 kilometres (12 mi) from Ivanovo (capital of Ivanovo Oblast) and 229 kilometres (142 mi) from Moscow. Chirikalovo is the nearest rural locality.
