= Gridino, Teykovsky District, Ivanovo Oblast =

Gridino Гридино
- Village
- Location within Ivanovo Oblast Location within Russia
- Coordinates: 56°43′N 40°31′E
- Country: Russia
- Region: Ivanovo Oblast
- District: Teykovsky District
- Time zone: UTC+3:00

Gridino (Russian: Гридино) is a rural locality (a village) in Teykovsky District, Ivanovo Oblast, Russia. Population: 11 (2010 census);

== Geography ==
This rural locality is located 15 kilometres (9.3 mi) from Teykovo (the district's administrative centre), 41 kilometres (25 mi) from Ivanovo (capital of Ivanovo Oblast) and 207 kilometres (129 mi) from Moscow. Morozovo is the nearest rural locality.
