= Poddybye =

Poddybye Поддыбье
- Village
- Location within Ivanovo Oblast Location within Russia
- Coordinates: 56°36′N 40°36′E
- Country: Russia
- Region: Ivanovo Oblast
- District: Teykovsky District
- Time zone: UTC+3:00

Poddybye (Russian: Поддыбье) is a rural locality (a selo) in Teykovsky District, Ivanovo Oblast, Russia. Population: 64 (2010 census);

== Geography ==
This rural locality is located 28 kilometres (17 mi) from Teykovo (the district's administrative centre), 48 kilometres (30 mi) from Ivanovo (capital of Ivanovo Oblast) and 206 kilometres (128 mi) from Moscow. Nikitino is the nearest rural locality.
