= Dashkovo =

Dashkovo Дашково
- Village
- Location within Ivanovo Oblast Location within Russia
- Coordinates: 56°40′N 40°34′E
- Country: Russia
- Region: Ivanovo Oblast
- District: Teykovsky District
- Time zone: UTC+3:00

Dashkovo (Russian: Дашково) is a rural locality (a village) in Teykovsky District, Ivanovo Oblast, Russia. Population: 22 (2010 census);

== Geography ==
This rural locality is located 20 kilometres (12 mi) from Teykovo (the district's administrative centre), 42 kilometres (26 mi) from Ivanovo (capital of Ivanovo Oblast) and 208 kilometres (129 mi) from Moscow. Podlesikha is the nearest rural locality.
