= Biryukovo, Ivanovo Oblast =

Biryukovo Бирюково
- Village
- Location within Ivanovo Oblast Location within Russia
- Coordinates: 56°48′N 40°23′E
- Country: Russia
- Region: Ivanovo Oblast
- District: Teykovsky District
- Time zone: UTC+3:00

Biryukovo (Russian: Бирюково) is a rural locality (a village) in Teykovsky District, Ivanovo Oblast, Russia. Population: 11 (2010 census);

== Geography ==
This rural locality is located 10 kilometres (6.2 mi) from Teykovo (the district's administrative centre), 40 kilometres (25 mi) from Ivanovo (capital of Ivanovo Oblast) and 206 kilometres (128 mi) from Moscow. Sakhtysh is the nearest rural locality.
