= Mosyakovo =

Mosyakovo Мосяково
- Village
- Location within Ivanovo Oblast Location within Russia
- Coordinates: 56°50′N 40°15′E
- Country: Russia
- Region: Ivanovo Oblast
- District: Teykovsky District
- Time zone: UTC+3:00

Mosyakovo (Russian: Мосяково) is a rural locality (a village) in Teykovsky District, Ivanovo Oblast, Russia. Population: 25 (2010 census);

== Geography ==
This rural locality is located 16 kilometres (9.9 mi) from Teykovo (the district's administrative centre), 46 kilometres (29 mi) from Ivanovo (capital of Ivanovo Oblast) and 202 kilometres (126 mi) from Moscow. Popino is the nearest rural locality.
