= Sanniki, Ivanovo Oblast =

Sanniki Санники
- Village
- Location within Ivanovo Oblast Location within Russia
- Coordinates: 56°36′N 40°29′E
- Country: Russia
- Region: Ivanovo Oblast
- District: Teykovsky District
- Time zone: UTC+3:00

Sanniki (Russian: Санники) is a rural locality (a village) in Teykovsky District, Ivanovo Oblast, Russia. Population: 12 (2010 census);

== Geography ==
This rural locality is located 28 kilometres (17 mi) from Teykovo (the district's administrative centre), 52 kilometres (32 mi) from Ivanovo (capital of Ivanovo Oblast) and 199 kilometres (124 mi) from Moscow. Sokatovo is the nearest rural locality.
