= Novoye Leushino =

Novoye Leushino Новое Леушино
- Village
- Location within Ivanovo Oblast Location within Russia
- Coordinates: 56°48′N 40°30′E
- Country: Russia
- Region: Ivanovo Oblast
- District: Teykovsky District
- Time zone: UTC+3:00

Novoye Leushino (Russian: Новое Леушино) is a rural locality (a selo) in Teykovsky District, Ivanovo Oblast, Russia. Population: 1,169 (2010 census);

== Geography ==
This rural locality is located 5 kilometres (3.1 mi) from Teykovo (the district's administrative centre), 35 kilometres (22 mi) from Ivanovo (capital of Ivanovo Oblast) and 211 kilometres (131 mi) from Moscow. Maksimtsevo is the nearest rural locality.
