= Grozilovo, Ivanovo Oblast =

Grozilovo Грозилово
- Village
- Location within Ivanovo Oblast Location within Russia
- Coordinates: 56°52′N 40°33′E
- Country: Russia
- Region: Ivanovo Oblast
- District: Teykovsky District
- Time zone: UTC+3:00

Grozilovo (Russian: Грозилово) is a rural locality (a village) in Teykovsky District, Ivanovo Oblast, Russia. Population: 232 (2010 census);

== Geography ==
This rural locality is located 3 kilometres (1.9 mi) from Teykovo (the district's administrative centre), 28 kilometres (17 mi) from Ivanovo (capital of Ivanovo Oblast) and 218 kilometres (135 mi) from Moscow. Subbochevo is the nearest rural locality.
