= Skvortsovo =

Skvortsovo Скворцово
- Village
- Location within Ivanovo Oblast Location within Russia
- Coordinates: 56°41′N 40°23′E
- Country: Russia
- Region: Ivanovo Oblast
- District: Teykovsky District
- Time zone: UTC+3:00

Skvortsovo (Russian: Скворцово) is a rural locality (a village) in Teykovsky District, Ivanovo Oblast, Russia. Population: 7 (2010 census);

== Geography ==
This rural locality is located 20 kilometres (12 mi) from Teykovo (the district's administrative centre), 48 kilometres (30 mi) from Ivanovo (capital of Ivanovo Oblast) and 199 kilometres (124 mi) from Moscow. Pyryevka is the nearest rural locality.
