= Bogatyrevo, Ivanovo Oblast =

Bogatyrevo Богатырево
- Village
- Location within Ivanovo Oblast Location within Russia
- Coordinates: 56°50′N 40°20′E
- Country: Russia
- Region: Ivanovo Oblast
- District: Teykovsky District
- Time zone: UTC+3:00

Bogatyrevo (Russian: Богатырево) is a rural locality (a village) in Teykovsky District, Ivanovo Oblast, Russia. Population: 48 (2010 census);

== Geography ==
This rural locality is located 12 kilometres (7.5 mi) from Teykovo (the district's administrative centre), 42 kilometres (26 mi) from Ivanovo (capital of Ivanovo Oblast) and 205 kilometres (127 mi) from Moscow. Mosyakovo is the nearest rural locality.
