= Maksimtsevo =

Maksimtsevo Максимцево
- Village
- Location within Ivanovo Oblast Location within Russia
- Coordinates: 56°49′N 40°31′E
- Country: Russia
- Region: Ivanovo Oblast
- District: Teykovsky District
- Time zone: UTC+3:00

Maksimtsevo (Russian: Максимцево) is a rural locality (a village) in Teykovsky District, Ivanovo Oblast, Russia. Population: 135 (2010 census);

== Geography ==
This rural locality is located 3 kilometres (1.9 mi) from Teykovo (the district's administrative centre), 32 kilometres (20 mi) from Ivanovo (capital of Ivanovo Oblast) and 213 kilometres (132 mi) from Moscow. Novoye Leushino is the nearest rural locality.
