= Lemeshki, Ivanovo Oblast =

Lemeshki Лемешки
- Village
- Location within Ivanovo Oblast Location within Russia
- Coordinates: 56°52′N 40°37′E
- Country: Russia
- Region: Ivanovo Oblast
- District: Teykovsky District
- Time zone: UTC+3:00

Lemeshki (Russian: Лемешки) is a rural locality (a village) in Teykovsky District, Ivanovo Oblast, Russia. Population: 118 (2010 census);

== Geography ==
This rural locality is located 6 kilometres (3.7 mi) from Teykovo (the district's administrative centre), 25 kilometres (16 mi) from Ivanovo (capital of Ivanovo Oblast) and 221 kilometres (137 mi) from Moscow. Bolshoye Klochkovo is the nearest rural locality.
