= Tonkino =

Tonkino (Russian: Тонкино) is the name of several inhabited localities (work settlements and railway stations) in Russia.

Urban localities

- Tonkino, Nizhny Novgorod Oblast, a work settlement in Tonkinsky District of Nizhny Novgorod Oblast

Rural localities

- Tonkino, Kirov Oblast, a railway station in Belorechensky Rural Okrug of Omutninsky District of Kirov Oblast
