= Sukhovo =

Sukhovo Сухово
- Village
- Location within Ivanovo Oblast Location within Russia
- Coordinates: 56°53′N 40°11′E
- Country: Russia
- Region: Ivanovo Oblast
- District: Teykovsky District
- Time zone: UTC+3:00

Sukhovo (Russian: Сухово) is a rural locality (a village) in Teykovsky District, Ivanovo Oblast, Russia. Population: 14 (2010 census);

== Geography ==
This rural locality is located 21 kilometres (13 mi) from Teykovo (the district's administrative centre), 49 kilometres (30 mi) from Ivanovo (capital of Ivanovo Oblast) and 200 kilometres (120 mi) from Moscow. Bolshiye Vyazovitsy is the nearest rural locality.
