= Bolshoye Stupkino =

Bolshoye Stupkino Большое Ступкино
- Village
- Location within Ivanovo Oblast Location within Russia
- Coordinates: 56°55′N 40°41′E
- Country: Russia
- Region: Ivanovo Oblast
- District: Teykovsky District
- Time zone: UTC+3:00

Bolshoye Stupkino (Russian: Большое Ступкино) is a rural locality (a village) in Teykovsky District, Ivanovo Oblast, Russia. Population: 12 (2010 census);

== Geography ==
This rural locality is located 12 kilometres (7.5 mi) from Teykovo (the district's administrative centre), 18 kilometres (11 mi) from Ivanovo (capital of Ivanovo Oblast) and 227 kilometres (141 mi) from Moscow. Sitnikovo is the nearest rural locality.
