= Maloye Klochkovo =

Maloye Klochkovo Малое Клочково
- Village
- Location within Ivanovo Oblast Location within Russia
- Coordinates: 56°53′N 40°22′E
- Country: Russia
- Region: Ivanovo Oblast
- District: Teykovsky District
- Time zone: UTC+3:00

Maloye Klochkovo (Russian: Малое Клочково) is a rural locality (a village) in Teykovsky District, Ivanovo Oblast, Russia. Population: 41 (2010 census);

== Geography ==
This rural locality is located 11 kilometres (6.8 mi) from Teykovo (the district's administrative centre), 38 kilometres (24 mi) from Ivanovo (capital of Ivanovo Oblast) and 210 kilometres (130 mi) from Moscow. Alferovka is the nearest rural locality.
