= Krasnitsy =

Krasnitsy Красницы
- Village
- Location within Ivanovo Oblast Location within Russia
- Coordinates: 56°52′N 40°08′E
- Country: Russia
- Region: Ivanovo Oblast
- District: Teykovsky District
- Time zone: UTC+3:00

Krasnitsy (Russian: Красницы) is a rural locality (a village) in Teykovsky District, Ivanovo Oblast, Russia. Population: 15 (2010 census);

== Geography ==
This rural locality is located 24 kilometres (15 mi) from Teykovo (the district's administrative centre), 52 kilometres (32 mi) from Ivanovo (capital of Ivanovo Oblast) and 197 kilometres (122 mi) from Moscow. Maryino is the nearest rural locality.
