= Alferyevo =

Alferyevo Алферьево
- Village
- Location within Ivanovo Oblast Location within Russia
- Coordinates: 56°55′N 40°37′E
- Country: Russia
- Region: Ivanovo Oblast
- District: Teykovsky District
- Time zone: UTC+3:00

Alferyevo (Russian: Алферьево) is a rural locality (a selo) in Teykovsky District, Ivanovo Oblast, Russia. Population: 54 (2010 census);

== Geography ==
This rural locality is located 10 kilometres (6.2 mi) from Teykovo (the district's administrative centre), 22 kilometres (14 mi) from Ivanovo (capital of Ivanovo Oblast) and 224 kilometres (139 mi) from Moscow. Znamovo is the nearest rural locality.
