= Terentyevo =

Terentyevo Терентьево
- Village
- Location within Ivanovo Oblast Location within Russia
- Coordinates: 56°50′N 40°28′E
- Country: Russia
- Region: Ivanovo Oblast
- District: Teykovsky District
- Time zone: UTC+3:00

Terentyevo (Russian: Терентьево) is a rural locality (a village) in Teykovsky District, Ivanovo Oblast, Russia. Population: 62 (2010 census);

== Geography ==
This rural locality is located 4 kilometres (2.5 mi) from Teykovo (the district's administrative centre), 35 kilometres (22 mi) from Ivanovo (capital of Ivanovo Oblast) and 211 kilometres (131 mi) from Moscow. Matrenkino is the nearest rural locality.
