= Koptevo, Teykovsky District, Ivanovo Oblast =

Koptevo Коптево
- Village
- Location within Ivanovo Oblast Location within Russia
- Coordinates: 56°42′N 40°30′E
- Country: Russia
- Region: Ivanovo Oblast
- District: Teykovsky District
- Time zone: UTC+3:00

Koptevo (Russian: Коптево) is a rural locality (a village) in Teykovsky District, Ivanovo Oblast, Russia. Population: 61 (2010 census);

== Geography ==
This rural locality is located 17 kilometres (11 mi) from Teykovo (the district's administrative centre), 43 kilometres (27 mi) from Ivanovo (capital of Ivanovo Oblast) and 205 kilometres (127 mi) from Moscow. Gridino is the nearest rural locality.
