= Alferovka =

Alferovka Алферовка
- Village
- Location within Ivanovo Oblast Location within Russia
- Coordinates: 56°53′N 40°18′E
- Country: Russia
- Region: Ivanovo Oblast
- District: Teykovsky District
- Time zone: UTC+3:00

Alferovka (Russian: Алферовка) is a rural locality (a village) in Teykovsky District, Ivanovo Oblast, Russia. Population: 45 (2010 census);

== Geography ==
This rural locality is located 14 kilometres (8.7 mi) from Teykovo (the district's administrative centre), 42 kilometres (26 mi) from Ivanovo (capital of Ivanovo Oblast) and 206 kilometres (128 mi) from Moscow. Maloye Klochkovo is the nearest rural locality.
