= Podlesikha =

Podlesikha Подлесиха
- Village
- Location within Ivanovo Oblast Location within Russia
- Coordinates: 56°39′N 40°34′E
- Country: Russia
- Region: Ivanovo Oblast
- District: Teykovsky District
- Time zone: UTC+3:00

Podlesikha (Russian: Подлесиха) is a rural locality (a village) in Teykovsky District, Ivanovo Oblast, Russia. Population: 34 (2010 census);

== Geography ==
This rural locality is located 21 kilometres (13 mi) from Teykovo (the district's administrative centre), 43 kilometres (27 mi) from Ivanovo (capital of Ivanovo Oblast) and 207 kilometres (129 mi) from Moscow. Dashkovo is the nearest rural locality.
