= Kondrakovo, Teykovsky District, Ivanovo Oblast =

Kondrakovo Кондраково
- Village
- Location within Ivanovo Oblast Location within Russia
- Coordinates: 56°51′N 40°11′E
- Country: Russia
- Region: Ivanovo Oblast
- District: Teykovsky District
- Time zone: UTC+3:00

Kondrakovo (Russian: Кондраково) is a rural locality (a village) in Teykovsky District, Ivanovo Oblast, Russia. Population: 114 (2010 census);

== Geography ==
This rural locality is located 20 kilometres (12 mi) from Teykovo (the district's administrative centre), 49 kilometres (30 mi) from Ivanovo (capital of Ivanovo Oblast) and 199 kilometres (124 mi) from Moscow. Krapivnovo is the nearest rural locality.
