= Sinyaya Osoka =

Sinyaya Osoka Синяя Осока
- Village
- Location within Ivanovo Oblast Location within Russia
- Coordinates: 56°43′N 40°39′E
- Country: Russia
- Region: Ivanovo Oblast
- District: Teykovsky District
- Time zone: UTC+3:00

Sinyaya Osoka (Russian: Синяя Осока) is a rural locality (a village) in Teykovsky District, Ivanovo Oblast, Russia. Population: 132 (2010 census);

== Geography ==
This rural locality is located 17 kilometres (11 mi) from Teykovo (the district's administrative centre), 36 kilometres (22 mi) from Ivanovo (capital of Ivanovo Oblast) and 215 kilometres (134 mi) from Moscow. Lezhnevskaya Roshcha is the nearest rural locality.
