= Nikitino, Teykovsky District =

Nikitino Никитино
- Village
- Location within Ivanovo Oblast Location within Russia
- Coordinates: 56°36′N 40°35′E
- Country: Russia
- Region: Ivanovo Oblast
- District: Teykovsky District
- Time zone: UTC+3:00

Nikitino (Russian: Никитино) is a rural locality (a village) in Teykovsky District, Ivanovo Oblast, Russia. Population: 5 (2010 census);

== Geography ==
This rural locality is located 27 kilometres (17 mi) from Teykovo (the district's administrative centre), 48 kilometres (30 mi) from Ivanovo (capital of Ivanovo Oblast) and 206 kilometres (128 mi) from Moscow. Poddybye is the nearest rural locality.
