= Ureyevo =

Ureyevo Уреево
- Village
- Location within Ivanovo Oblast Location within Russia
- Coordinates: 56°37′N 40°22′E
- Country: Russia
- Region: Ivanovo Oblast
- District: Teykovsky District
- Time zone: UTC+3:00

Ureyevo (Russian: Уреево) is a rural locality (a village) in Teykovsky District, Ivanovo Oblast, Russia. Population: 16 (2010 census);

== Geography ==
This rural locality is located 28 kilometres (17 mi) from Teykovo (the district's administrative centre), 55 kilometres (34 mi) from Ivanovo (capital of Ivanovo Oblast) and 194 kilometres (121 mi) from Moscow. Khlebnitsy is the nearest rural locality.
