= Gorki, Teykovsky District, Ivanovo Oblast =

Gorki Горки
- Village
- Location within Ivanovo Oblast Location within Russia
- Coordinates: 56°52′N 40°35′E
- Country: Russia
- Region: Ivanovo Oblast
- District: Teykovsky District
- Time zone: UTC+3:00

Gorki (Russian: Горки) is a rural locality (a village) in Teykovsky District, Ivanovo Oblast, Russia. Population: 77 (2010 census);

== Geography ==
This rural locality is located 4 kilometres (2.5 mi) from Teykovo (the district's administrative centre), 26 kilometres (16 mi) from Ivanovo (capital of Ivanovo Oblast) and 219 kilometres (136 mi) from Moscow. Bolshoye Klochkovo is the nearest rural locality.
