= Yakshino, Teykovsky District =

Yakshino Якшино
- Village
- Location within Ivanovo Oblast Location within Russia
- Coordinates: 56°45′N 40°31′E
- Country: Russia
- Region: Ivanovo Oblast
- District: Teykovsky District
- Time zone: UTC+3:00

Yakshino (Russian: Якшино) is a rural locality (a selo) in Teykovsky District, Ivanovo Oblast, Russia. Population: 35 (2010 census);

== Geography ==
This rural locality is located 11 kilometres (6.8 mi) from Teykovo (the district's administrative centre), 38 kilometres (24 mi) from Ivanovo (capital of Ivanovo Oblast) and 209 kilometres (130 mi) from Moscow. Shiborskaya is the nearest rural locality.
