= Nelsha =

Nelsha Нельша
- Village
- Location within Ivanovo Oblast Location within Russia
- Coordinates: 56°42′N 40°25′E
- Country: Russia
- Region: Ivanovo Oblast
- District: Teykovsky District
- Time zone: UTC+3:00

Nelsha (Russian: Нельша) is a rural locality (a village) in Teykovsky District, Ivanovo Oblast, Russia. Population: 170 (2010 census);

== Geography ==
This rural locality is located 17 kilometres (11 mi) from Teykovo (the district's administrative centre), 45 kilometres (28 mi) from Ivanovo (capital of Ivanovo Oblast) and 202 kilometres (126 mi) from Moscow. Yergunitsy is the nearest rural locality.
