= Bolshoye Klochkovo =

Bolshoye Klochkovo Большое Клочково
- Village
- Location within Ivanovo Oblast Location within Russia
- Coordinates: 56°53′N 40°36′E
- Country: Russia
- Region: Ivanovo Oblast
- District: Teykovsky District
- Time zone: UTC+3:00

Bolshoye Klochkovo (Russian: Большое Клочково) is a rural locality (a village) in Teykovsky District, Ivanovo Oblast, Russia. Population: 269 (2010 census);

== Geography ==
This rural locality is located 6 kilometres (3.7 mi) from Teykovo (the district's administrative centre), 25 kilometres (16 mi) from Ivanovo (capital of Ivanovo Oblast) and 221 kilometres (137 mi) from Moscow. Gorki is the nearest rural locality.
