= Repnovo =

Repnovo Репново
- Village
- Location within Ivanovo Oblast Location within Russia
- Coordinates: 56°46′N 40°32′E
- Country: Russia
- Region: Ivanovo Oblast
- District: Teykovsky District
- Time zone: UTC+3:00

Repnovo (Russian: Репново) is a rural locality (a village) in Teykovsky District, Ivanovo Oblast, Russia. Population: 22 (2010 census);

== Geography ==
This rural locality is located 8 kilometres (5.0 mi) from Teykovo (the district's administrative centre), 35 kilometres (22 mi) from Ivanovo (capital of Ivanovo Oblast) and 212 kilometres (132 mi) from Moscow. Sidorino is the nearest rural locality.
