= Krapivnik =

Krapivnik Крапивник
- Village
- Location within Ivanovo Oblast Location within Russia
- Coordinates: 56°49′N 40°34′E
- Country: Russia
- Region: Ivanovo Oblast
- District: Teykovsky District
- Time zone: UTC+3:00

Krapivnik (Russian: Крапивник) is a rural locality (a village) in Teykovsky District, Ivanovo Oblast, Russia. Population: 70 (2010 census);

== Geography ==
This rural locality is located 4 kilometres (2.5 mi) from Teykovo (the district's administrative centre), 30 kilometres (19 mi) from Ivanovo (capital of Ivanovo Oblast) and 216 kilometres (134 mi) from Moscow. Grigoryevo is the nearest rural locality.
