= Aleksandrović =

Aleksandrović is a South Slavic patronymic and surname. The surname corresponds to the Russian surname Aleksandrovich and the Polish surname Aleksandrowicz/Alexandrowicz. Notable people with the surname include:

== Surname ==
- Ljubomir Aleksandrović (1828–1887), Serbian painter
- Bojan Aleksandrović (born 1977), Serbian Vlach priest

== Patronymic ==
- Antun Aleksandrović Dalmatin (died 1597), Dalmatian Protestant translator
