= Lukyanovo, Ivanovo Oblast =

Lukyanovo Лукьяново
- Village
- Location within Ivanovo Oblast Location within Russia
- Coordinates: 56°51′N 40°13′E
- Country: Russia
- Region: Ivanovo Oblast
- District: Teykovsky District
- Time zone: UTC+3:00

Lukyanovo (Russian: Лукьяново) is a rural locality (a village) in Teykovsky District, Ivanovo Oblast, Russia. Population: 10 (2010 census);

== Geography ==
This rural locality is located 19 kilometres (12 mi) from Teykovo (the district's administrative centre), 48 kilometres (30 mi) from Ivanovo (capital of Ivanovo Oblast) and 200 kilometres (120 mi) from Moscow. Popino is the nearest rural locality.
