= Dumino, Ivanovo Oblast =

Dumino Думино
- Village
- Location within Ivanovo Oblast Location within Russia
- Coordinates: 56°42′N 40°19′E
- Country: Russia
- Region: Ivanovo Oblast
- District: Teykovsky District
- Time zone: UTC+3:00

Dumino (Russian: Думино) is a rural locality (a village) in Teykovsky District, Ivanovo Oblast, Russia. Population: 111 (2010 census);

== Geography ==
This rural locality is located 21 kilometres (13 mi) from Teykovo (the district's administrative centre), 50 kilometres (31 mi) from Ivanovo (capital of Ivanovo Oblast) and 196 kilometres (122 mi) from Moscow. Varvarino is the nearest rural locality.
