= Morozovo, Teykovsky District, Ivanovo Oblast =

Morozovo Морозово
- Village
- Location within Ivanovo Oblast Location within Russia
- Coordinates: 56°43′N 40°31′E
- Country: Russia
- Region: Ivanovo Oblast
- District: Teykovsky District
- Time zone: UTC+3:00

Morozovo (Russian: Морозово) is a rural locality (a selo) in Teykovsky District, Ivanovo Oblast, Russia. Population: 916 (2010 census);

== Geography ==
This rural locality is located 14 kilometres (8.7 mi) from Teykovo (the district's administrative centre), 40 kilometres (25 mi) from Ivanovo (capital of Ivanovo Oblast) and 207 kilometres (129 mi) from Moscow. Gridino is the nearest rural locality.
