= Zernilovo =

Zernilovo Зернилово
- Village
- Location within Ivanovo Oblast Location within Russia
- Coordinates: 56°34′N 40°23′E
- Country: Russia
- Region: Ivanovo Oblast
- District: Teykovsky District
- Time zone: UTC+3:00

Zernilovo (Russian: Зернилово) is a rural locality (a selo) in Teykovsky District, Ivanovo Oblast, Russia. Population: 92 (2010 census);

== Geography ==
This rural locality is located 33 kilometres (21 mi) from Teykovo (the district's administrative centre), 59 kilometres (37 mi) from Ivanovo (capital of Ivanovo Oblast) and 192 kilometres (119 mi) from Moscow. Sankovo is the nearest rural locality.
