= Maly Takovets =

Maly Takovets Малый Таковец
- Village
- Location within Ivanovo Oblast Location within Russia
- Coordinates: 56°49′N 40°38′E
- Country: Russia
- Region: Ivanovo Oblast
- District: Teykovsky District
- Time zone: UTC+3:00

Maly Takovets (Russian: Малый Таковец) is a rural locality (a village) in Teykovsky District, Ivanovo Oblast, Russia. Population: 44 (2010 census);

== Geography ==
This rural locality is located 7 kilometres (4.3 mi) from Teykovo (the district's administrative centre), 26 kilometres (16 mi) from Ivanovo (capital of Ivanovo Oblast) and 220 kilometres (140 mi) from Moscow. Burakovo is the nearest rural locality.
