= Pershino, Teykovsky District =

Pershino Першино
- Village
- Location within Ivanovo Oblast Location within Russia
- Coordinates: 56°54′N 40°30′E
- Country: Russia
- Region: Ivanovo Oblast
- District: Teykovsky District
- Time zone: UTC+3:00

Pershino (Russian: Першино) is a rural locality (a selo) in Teykovsky District, Ivanovo Oblast, Russia. Population: 134 (2010 census);

== Geography ==
This rural locality is located 5 kilometres (3.1 mi) from Teykovo (the district's administrative centre), 29 kilometres (18 mi) from Ivanovo (capital of Ivanovo Oblast) and 217 kilometres (135 mi) from Moscow. Subbochevo is the nearest rural locality.
