= Buysky =

Buysky (masculine), Buyskaya (feminine), or Buyskoye (neuter) may refer to:

- Buysky District, a district of Kostroma Oblast, Russia
- Buysky (rural locality) (Buyskaya, Buyskoye), name of several rural localities in Russia
