= Yelkhovka, Ivanovo Oblast =

Yelkhovka Елховка
- Village
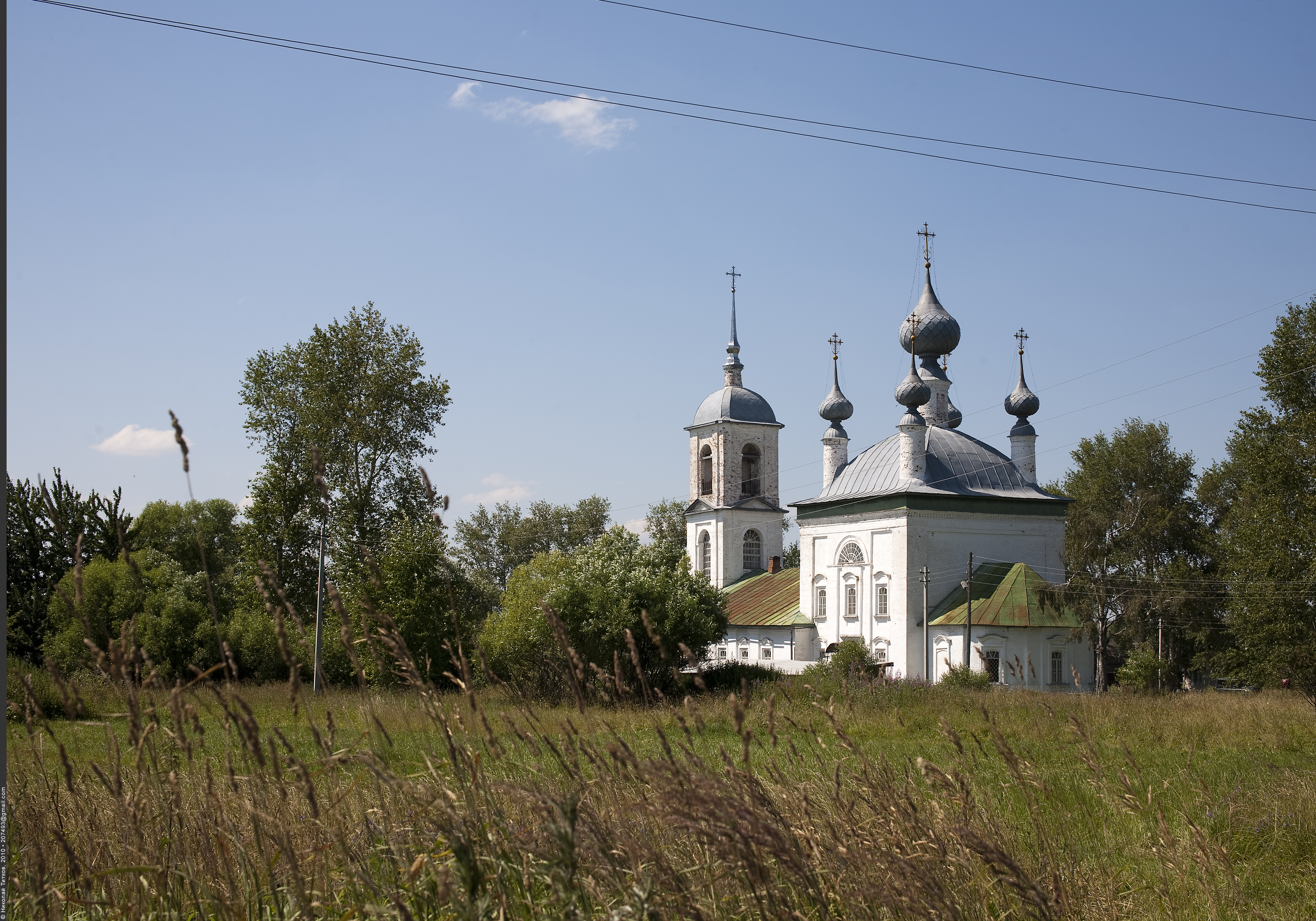

- Location within Ivanovo Oblast Location within Russia
- Coordinates: 56°37′N 40°30′E
- Country: Russia
- Region: Ivanovo Oblast
- District: Teykovsky District
- Time zone: UTC+3:00

Yelkhovka (Russian: Елховка) is a rural locality (a selo) in Teykovsky District, Ivanovo Oblast, Russia. Population: 426 (2010 census);

== Geography ==
This rural locality is located 26 kilometres (16 mi) from Teykovo (the district's administrative centre), 50 kilometres (31 mi) from Ivanovo (capital of Ivanovo Oblast) and 201 kilometres (125 mi) from Moscow. Penkovo is the nearest rural locality.
