= Nikolai Aleksandrovich =

Nikolai Aleksandrovich or Nikolay Aleksandrovich (Russian: Николай Александрович) is a Russian male given name. It may refer to:

- Nikolai Aleksandrovich Abramov (1984–2011), a Russian football player
- Nikolai Aleksandrovich Aksyonov (born 1970), a Russian Olympic rower
- Nikolai Aleksandrovich Aristov (1847 – c. 1903), a Russian türkologist
- Nikolai Aleksandrovich Averyanov (born 1989), a Russian professional football player
- Nikolai Alexandrovich Berdyaev (1874–1948), a Russian philosopher, theologian, and Christian existentialist
- Nikolai Aleksandrovich Bernstein (1896–1966), a Soviet neurophysiologist
- Nikolai Aleksandrovich Dergachyov (born 1994), a Russian football player
- Nikolai Aleksandrovich Dobrolyubov (1836–1861), a Russian literary critic, journalist, poet and revolutionary democrat
- Nikolay Aleksandrovich Kashtalinsky (1840–1917), a general in the Imperial Russian Army
- Nikolai Aleksandrovich Kozyrev (1908–1983), a Russian astronomer and astrophysicist
- Nikolai Aleksandrovich Krasil'nikov (1896–1973), a Russian microbiologist and soil scientist
- Nikolai Aleksandrovich Lebedev (1914–1942), a hero of the Soviet Union
- Nikolai Aleksandrovich Menshutkin (1842–1907), a Russian chemist
- Nikolai Aleksandrovich Nevsky (1892–1937), a Russian and Soviet linguist
- Nikolai Aleksandrovich Paklyanov (born 1986), a Russian football player
- Nikolay Aleksandrovich Panin-Kolomenkin (1872–1956), a Russian figure skater and coach
- Nikolai Aleksandrovich Romanov (1868–1918), the last Emperor of Russia
- Nikolai Aleksandrovich Samoylov (born 1980), a Russian football player
- Nikolai Aleksandrovich Semashko (1874–1949), a Russian statesman
- Nikolai Aleksandrovich Stain (born 1964), a Russian football coach and a former player
- Nikolai Aleksandrovich Stasenko (born 1987), a Belarusian ice hockey player
- Nikolai Aleksandrovich Tikhonov (1905–1997), a Russian-Ukrainian Soviet statesman during the Cold War
- Nikolai Aleksandrovich Tolstykh (born 1956), a Russian football administrator and a former player
- Nikolai Aleksandrovich Uglanov (1886–1937), a Russian Bolshevik politician
- Nikolai Aleksandrovich Yaroshhenko (1846–1898), a Russian painter
