= Buysky (rural locality) =

Buysky (Russian: Буйский; masculine), Buyskaya (Буйская; feminine), or Buyskoye (Буйское; neuter) is the name of several rural localities in Russia:

- Buyskoye, Kirov Oblast, a selo in Buysky Rural Okrug of Urzhumsky District of Kirov Oblast
- Buyskoye, Nizhny Novgorod Oblast, a village in Vyazovsky Selsoviet of Tonkinsky District of Nizhny Novgorod Oblast
