= Nikolai Paklyanov =

Russian footballer

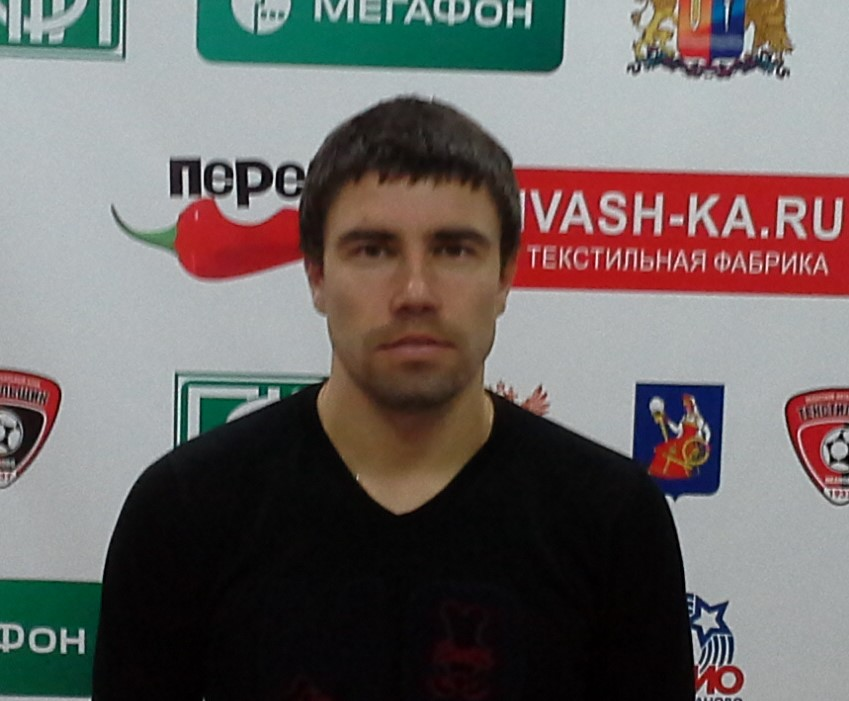
- Paklyanov in 2014

Personal information
- Full name: Nikolai Aleksandrovich Paklyanov
- Date of birth: 21 September 1986 (age 40)
- Place of birth: Teykovo, Ivanovo Oblast, Russian SFSR, Soviet Union
- Height: 1.76 m (5 ft 9 1/2 in)
- Positions: Defender; midfielder

Senior career*
Years	Team	Apps	(Gls)
2005–2007	FC Tekstilshchik-Telekom Ivanovo	79	(2)
2008	FC Sheksna Cherepovets	32	(3)
2009–2013	FC Spartak Kostroma	143	(10)
2014–2015	FC Tekstilschik Ivanovo	30	(0)
2016	FC Vichuga		
- * Club domestic league appearances and goals

Nikolai Aleksandrovich Paklyanov (Russian: Николай Александрович Паклянов; born 21 September 1986) is a former Russian professional football player.

== Club career ==
He played in the Russian Football National League for FC Tekstilshchik-Telekom Ivanovo in 2007.
