= Aleksandrowicz =

Aleksandrowicz (Polish pronunciation: [alɛksanˈdrɔvitʂ]) or Alexandrowicz is a Polish-language surname derived from the given name Alexander. The Russian-language equivalent is Aleksandrovich and the Serbian is Aleksandrović. Notable people with the surname include:

- Julian Aleksandrowicz (1908–1988), Polish professor of medicine
- Patryk Aleksandrowicz (born 1983), Polish footballer
- Ra'anan Alexandrowicz (born 1969), Israeli film director
- Ze'ev Aleksandrowicz (1905–1992), Israeli photographer
