= Yelkhovka, Vladimir Oblast =

Yelkhovka Елховка
- Village
- Location within Vladimir Oblast Location within Russia
- Coordinates: 56°12′N 39°56′E
- Country: Russia
- Region: Vladimir Oblast
- District: Sobinsky District
- Time zone: UTC+3:00

Yelkhovka (Russian: Елховка) is a rural locality (a village) in Rozhdestvenskoye Rural Settlement, Sobinsky District, Vladimir Oblast, Russia. The population was 26 as of 2010.

== Geography ==
Yelkhovka is located 34 km north of Sobinka (the district's administrative centre) by road. Burykino is the nearest rural locality.
