= Ljubomir Aleksandrović =

Serbian painter

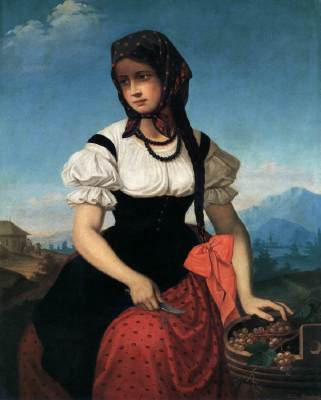
Grape Harvest Girl (1878)

Ljubomir Aleksandrović (Serbian: Љубомир Александровић; 15 June 1828, Semarton, Banat – 15/27 December 1887, Budapest) was a Serbian painter. He specialized in portraits and iconography.

== Biography ==
He began receiving lessons at an early age from Nikola Aleksić, then continued with Konstantin Danil until 1842, when he assisted him in painting an iconostasis at the Cathedral church in Timișoara. Around 1850, he studied at the Academy of Fine Arts, Vienna.

At the beginning of the 1860s, he settled in Timișoara, where he painted portraits (many from photographs) and icons and lived for much of his life. In 1869, he created the last of his major works that would be dependent on what he had learned from Danil; at the Serbian church in the village of Nemet in Timiș County.

He was generally quite poor and suffered from a recurring nervous illness, heightened by unspecified family conflicts. It worsened to the point where it became necessary to place him in the mental asylum at Leopold's Field (Lipótmező), in Budapest, where he died. In 1893, his remains were returned to Timișoara and reinterred.

His most notable icons may be seen at Orthodox churches in Botoš (now part of Zrenjanin) and Ferdin (now known as Novi Kozjak).
