= Alexandrowicz =

Alexandrowicz is a surname of Polish language origin, a variant of Aleksandrowicz. Notable people with the surname include:

- Charles Henry Alexandrowicz, (1902–1975), lawyer and scholar of international law
- Ra'anan Alexandrowicz, Israeli director, screenwriter and editor
