= Tonkino, Nizhny Novgorod Oblast =

Tonkino Тонкино
- Urban-type settlement
- Interactive map of Tonkino
- Location of Tonkino Tonkino (Nizhny Novgorod Oblast)
- Coordinates: 57.3716°N 46.4610°E
- Country: Russia
- Federal subject: Nizhny Novgorod Oblast
- Administrative district: Tonkinsky District
- Founded: 1710

Population (2010 Census)
  - Total: 5,103
  - Estimate (2025): 4,360 (−14.6%)
- Time zone: UTC+3 (MSK)
- Postal code: 606970
- OKTMO ID: 22652151051

Tonkino (Russian: То́нкино) is an urban locality (an urban-type settlement) in Tonkinsky District of Nizhny Novgorod Oblast, Russia. Population: 5,103 (2010 census); 5,499 (2002 census); 5,637 (1989 Soviet census).
