= Tonkinsky District =

Tonkinsky District Тонкинский район (Russian)
- District
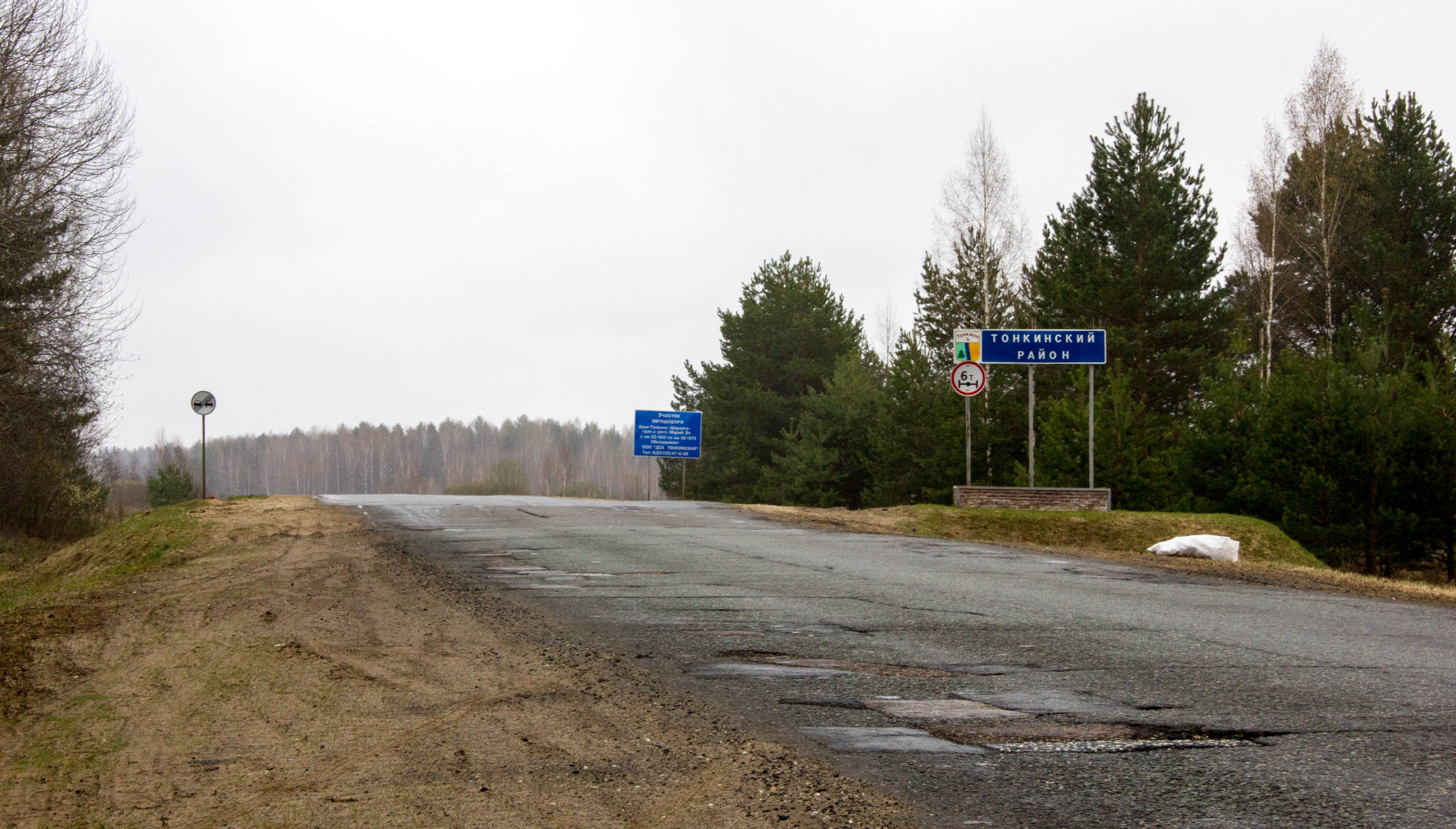
- Entering Tonkinsky District

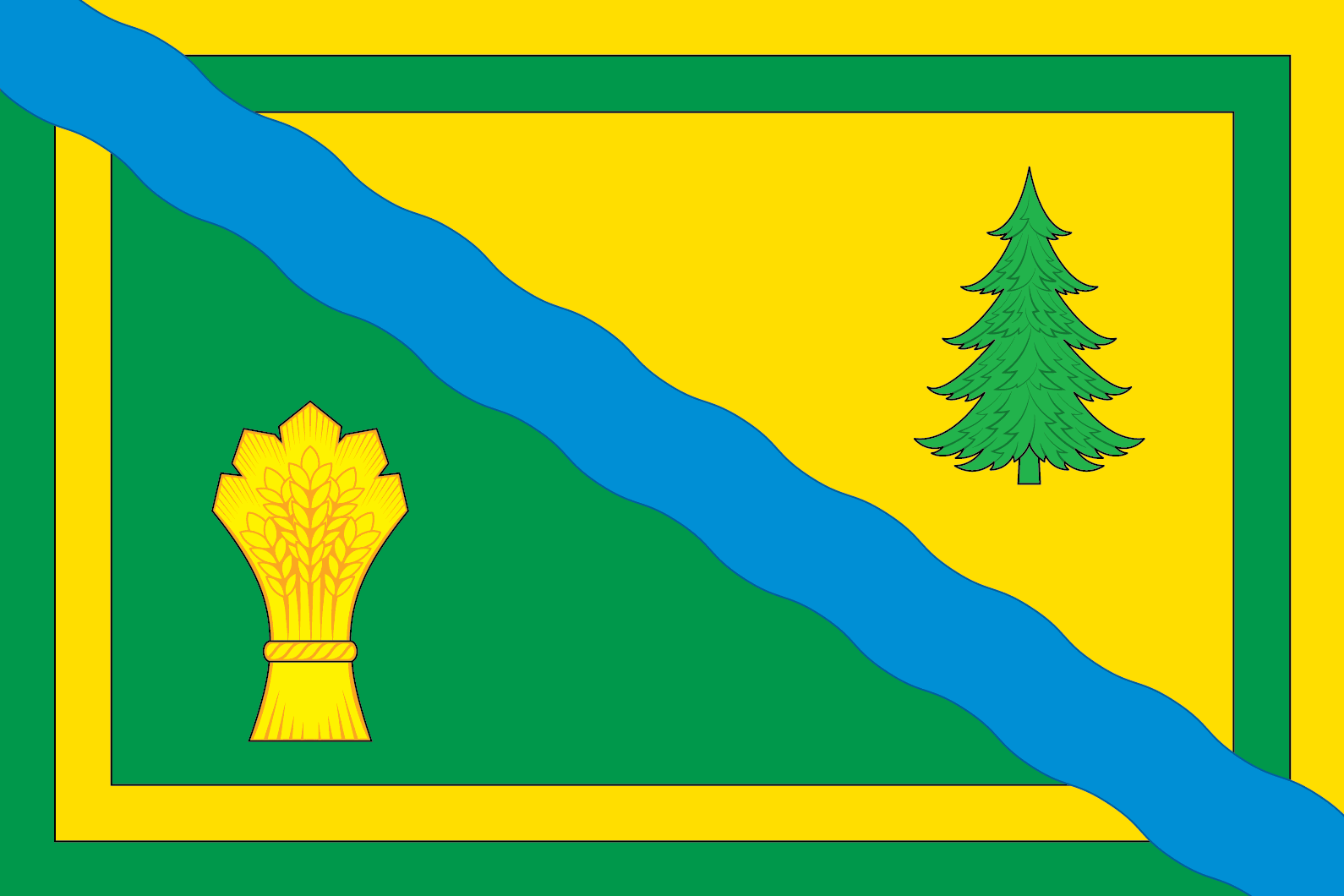
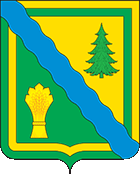
- Flag Coat of arms
- Location of Tonkinsky District in Nizhny Novgorod Oblast
- Coordinates: 57°22′19″N 46°27′35″E
- Country: Russia
- Federal subject: Nizhny Novgorod Oblast
- Established: 1929
- Administrative center: Tonkino

Area
  - Total: 1,018.5 km^{2} (393.2 sq mi)

Population (2010 Census)
  - Total: 9,007
  - Density: 8.843/km^{2} (22.90/sq mi)
  - Urban: 56.7%
  - Rural: 43.3%

Administrative structure
  - Administrative divisions: 1 Work settlements, 4 Selsoviets
  - Inhabited localities: 1 urban-type settlements, 83 rural localities

Municipal structure
  - Municipally incorporated as: Tonkinsky Municipal District
  - Municipal divisions: 1 urban settlements, 4 rural settlements
- Time zone: UTC+3 (MSK)
- OKTMO ID: 22652000
- Website: http://www.tonkino.ru

Tonkinsky District (Russian: То́нкинский райо́н) is an administrative district (raion), one of the forty in Nizhny Novgorod Oblast, Russia. Municipally, it is incorporated as Tonkinsky Municipal District. It is located in the northeast of the oblast. The area of the district is 1,018.5 square kilometers (393.2 sq mi). Its administrative center is the urban locality (a work settlement) of Tonkino. Population: 9,007 (2010 Census); 11,097 (2002 census); 12,551 (1989 Soviet census). The population of Tonkino accounts for 56.7% of the district's total population.

== History ==
The district was established in 1929.
