= Teykovo =

Town in Ivanovo Oblast, Russia

Teykovo Тейково
- Town
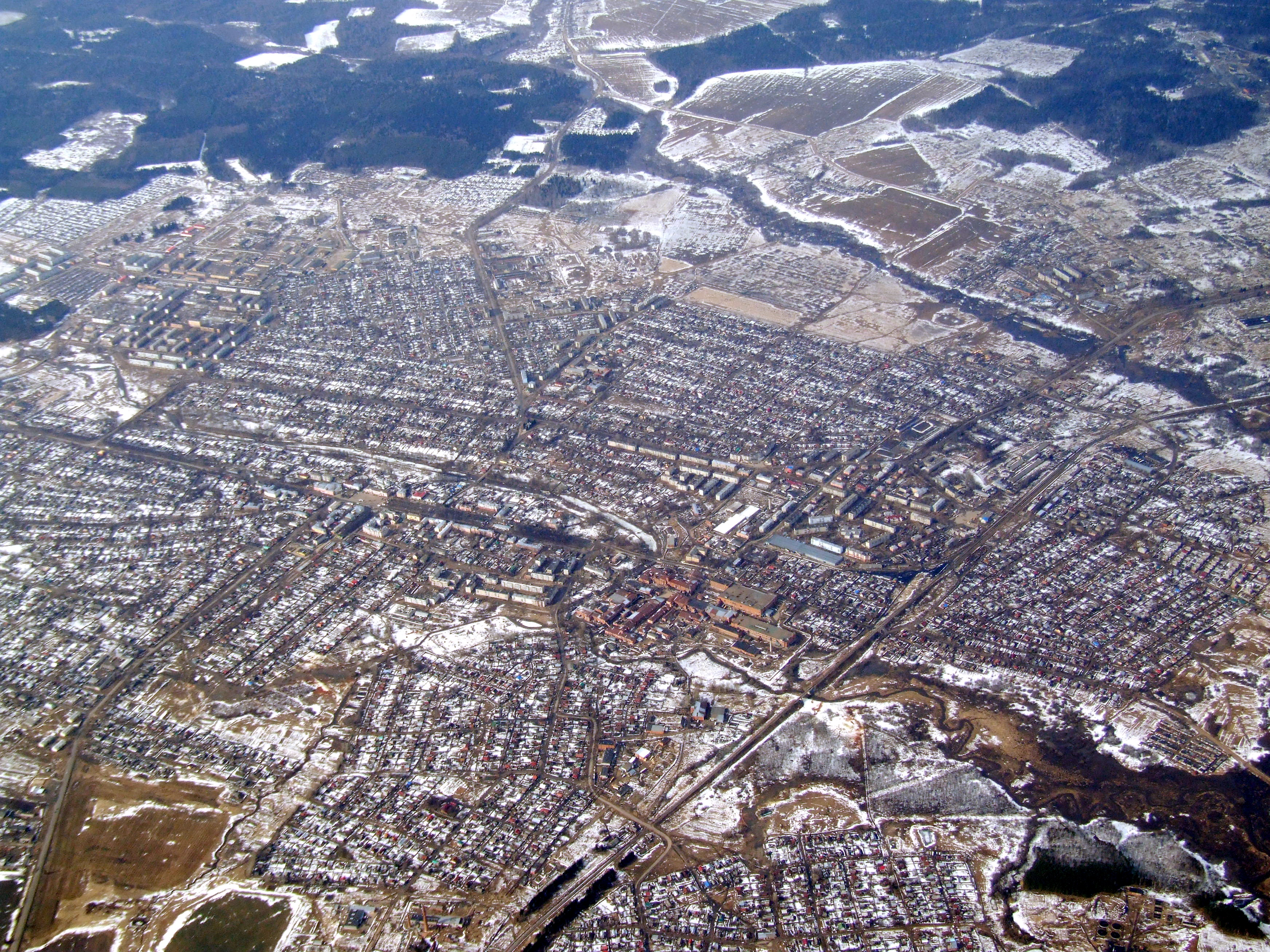
- Aerial view of Teykovo

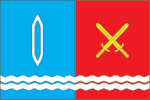
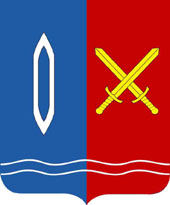
- Flag Coat of arms
- Interactive map of Teykovo
- Location of Teykovo Teykovo (Ivanovo Oblast)
- Coordinates: 56°51′17″N 40°32′28″E
- Country: Russia
- Federal subject: Ivanovo Oblast
- Founded: 17th century
- Town status since: 1918
- Elevation: 125 m (410 ft)

Population (2010 Census)
  - Total: 34,976
  - Estimate (2021): 31,305 (−10.5%)

Administrative status
  - Subordinated to: Town of Teykovo
  - Capital of: Teykovsky District, Town of Teykovo

Municipal status
  - Urban okrug: Teykovo Urban Okrug
  - Capital of: Teykovo Urban Okrug, Teykovsky Municipal District
- Time zone: UTC+3 (MSK)
- Postal code: 155040–155048
- OKTMO ID: 24707000001
- Website: teikovo37.ru

Teykovo (Russian: Те́йково) is a town in Ivanovo Oblast, Russia, located on the Vyazma River 35 kilometers (22 mi) southwest of Ivanovo. Population: 31,305 (2021 census); 34,976 (2010 census); 36,686 (2002 census); 38,126 (1989 Soviet census); 42,800 (1975).

== History ==
It was founded in the 17th century and was granted town status in 1918.

== Administrative and municipal status ==
Within the framework of administrative divisions, Teykovo serves as the administrative center of Teykovsky District, even though it is not a part of it. As an administrative division, it is incorporated separately as the Town of Teykovo—an administrative unit with the status equal to that of the districts. As a municipal division, the Town of Teykovo is incorporated as Teykovo Urban Okrug.

== Military ==
The town is home to the 54th Guards Rocket Division of the Strategic Rocket Forces where projects like the mobile Topol-M intercontinental ballistic missile system are operated from.

== Notable people ==
- Nikolai Paklyanov (born 1986) - former Russian footballer
