= Teykovsky District =

Teykovsky District Тейковский район (Russian)
- District
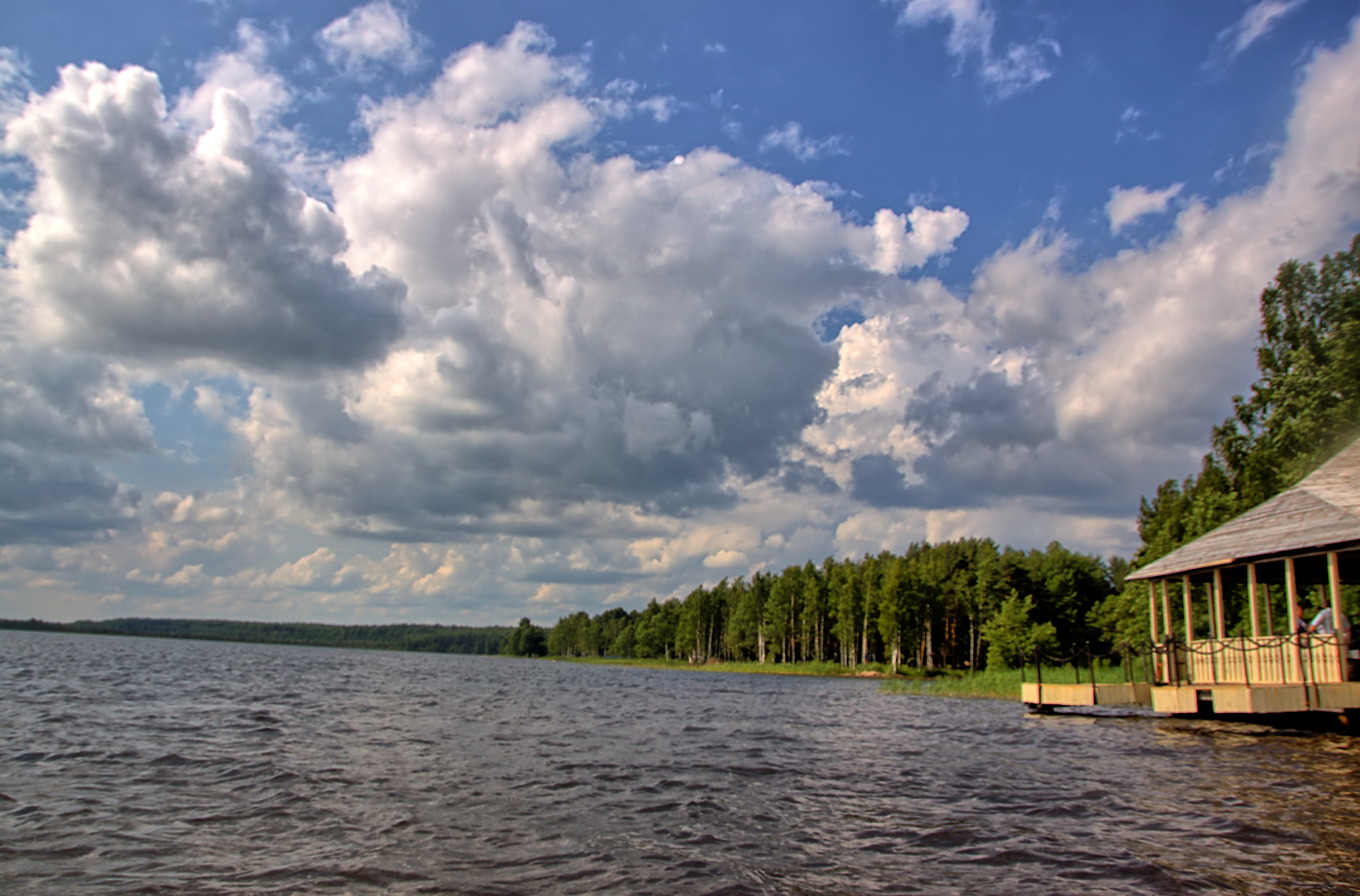
- Lake Rubskoye, Teykovsky District

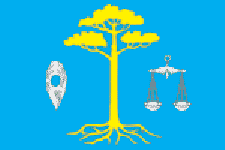
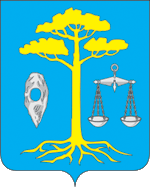
- Flag Coat of arms
- Location of Teykovsky District in Ivanovo Oblast
- Coordinates: 56°51′N 40°33′E
- Country: Russia
- Federal subject: Ivanovo Oblast
- Established: 14 January 1929
- Administrative center: Teykovo

Area
  - Total: 1,275 km^{2} (492 sq mi)

Population (2010 Census)
  - Total: 12,232
  - Density: 9.594/km^{2} (24.85/sq mi)
  - Urban: 16.8%
  - Rural: 83.2%

Administrative structure
  - Inhabited localities: 141 rural localities

Municipal structure
  - Municipally incorporated as: Teykovsky Municipal District
  - Municipal divisions: 1 urban settlements, 5 rural settlements
- Time zone: UTC+3 (MSK)
- OKTMO ID: 24629000
- Website: http://www.teikradmin.ru/

Teykovsky District (Russian: Те́йковский райо́н) is an administrative and municipal district (raion), one of the twenty-one in Ivanovo Oblast, Russia. It is located in the southwest of the oblast. The area of the district is 1,275 square kilometers (492 sq mi). Its administrative center is the town of Teykovo (which is not administratively a part of the district). Population: 10,614 (2021 census); 12,232 (2010 census); 14,418 (2002 Census); 19,287 (1989 Soviet census).

== Administrative and municipal status ==
Within the framework of administrative divisions, Teykovsky District is one of the twenty-one in the oblast. The town of Teykovo serves as its administrative center, despite being incorporated separately as an administrative unit with the status equal to that of the districts.

As a municipal division, the district is incorporated as Teykovsky Municipal District. The Town of Teykovo is incorporated separately from the district as Teykovo Urban Okrug.
