= Glukhov =

Glukhov, Glukhova (Russian: Глухов, Глухова) may refer to:

- Hlukhiv, a town in Sumy Oblast, Ukraine, known in Russian as Glukhov

== People with the surname ==
- Alexei Glukhov (born 1984), Russian ice hockey player
- Andrey Glukhov (born 1972), Russian Olympic rower
- Konstantin Gluhov (born 1990), Latvian-Russian kickboxer and mixed martial artist
- Mikhail Glukhov (born 1988), Russian ice hockey player
- Sergey Glukhov (born 1993), Russian curler

== See also ==
- Glukhovo
- Glukhovka
