= Semigorye =

Semigorye (Russian: Семигорье) is the name of several rural localities in Russia:

- Semigorye, Ivanovo Oblast, a village in Vichugsky District of Ivanovo Oblast; 57°23′N 41°49′E
- Semigorye, Vologda Oblast, a village in Kipelovsky Selsoviet of Vologodsky District in Vologda Oblast
