= Ropotovo, Ivanovo Oblast =

Ropotovo Ропотово
- Village
- Location within Ivanovo Oblast Location within Russia
- Coordinates: 57°17′N 41°44′E
- Country: Russia
- Region: Ivanovo Oblast
- District: Vichugsky District
- Time zone: UTC+3:00

Ropotovo (Russian: Ропотово) is a rural locality (a village) in Vichugsky District, Ivanovo Oblast, Russia. Population: 15 (2010 census);

== Geography ==
This rural locality is located 14 km from Vichuga (the district's administrative centre), 57 km from Ivanovo (capital of Ivanovo Oblast) and 300 km from Moscow. Novoshino is the nearest rural locality.
