= Sopegino =

Sopegino Сопегино
- Village
- Location within Ivanovo Oblast Location within Russia
- Coordinates: 57°10′N 41°51′E
- Country: Russia
- Region: Ivanovo Oblast
- District: Vichugsky District
- Time zone: UTC+3:00

Sopegino (Russian: Сопегино) is a rural locality (a village) in Vichugsky District, Ivanovo Oblast, Russia. Population: 5 (2010 census);

== Geography ==
This rural locality is located 6 km from Vichuga (the district's administrative centre), 57 km from Ivanovo (capital of Ivanovo Oblast) and 300 km from Moscow. Zakharikha is the nearest rural locality.
