= Ustinovo, Ivanovo Oblast =

Ustinovo Устиново
- Village
- Location within Ivanovo Oblast Location within Russia
- Coordinates: 57°08′N 42°19′E
- Country: Russia
- Region: Ivanovo Oblast
- District: Vichugsky District
- Time zone: UTC+3:00

Ustinovo (Russian: Устиново) is a rural locality (a village) in Vichugsky District, Ivanovo Oblast, Russia. Population: 31 (2010 census); 66 (2002 census);

== Geography ==
This rural locality is located 26 km from Vichuga (the district's administrative centre), 84 km from Ivanovo (capital of Ivanovo Oblast) and 324 km from Moscow. Pistsovo Novoye is the nearest rural locality.
