= Kosachevo =

Kosachevo Косачево
- Village
- Location within Ivanovo Oblast Location within Russia
- Coordinates: 57°18′N 41°56′E
- Country: Russia
- Region: Ivanovo Oblast
- District: Vichugsky District
- Time zone: UTC+3:00

Kosachevo (Russian: Косачево) is a rural locality (a village) in Vichugsky District, Ivanovo Oblast, Russia. Population: 104 (2010 census);

== Geography ==
This rural locality is located 11 km from Vichuga (the district's administrative centre), 68 km from Ivanovo (capital of Ivanovo Oblast) and 312 km from Moscow. Vorobyovo is the nearest rural locality.
