= Korovino Nizhneye =

Korovino Nizhneye Коровино Нижнее
- Village
- Location within Ivanovo Oblast Location within Russia
- Coordinates: 57°11′N 42°12′E
- Country: Russia
- Region: Ivanovo Oblast
- District: Vichugsky District
- Time zone: UTC+3:00

Korovino Nizhneye (Russian: Коровино Нижнее) is a rural locality (a village) in Vichugsky District, Ivanovo Oblast, Russia. Population: 164 (2010 census); 273 (2002 census);

== Geography ==
This rural locality is located 18 km from Vichuga (the district's administrative centre), 78 km from Ivanovo (capital of Ivanovo Oblast) and 319 km from Moscow. Semyonovskoye is the nearest rural locality.
