= Khrenovo, Ivanovo Oblast =

Khrenovo Хреново
- Village
- Location within Ivanovo Oblast Location within Russia
- Coordinates: 57°15′N 41°53′E
- Country: Russia
- Region: Ivanovo Oblast
- District: Vichugsky District
- Time zone: UTC+3:00

Khrenovo (Russian: Хреново) is a rural locality (a village) in Vichugsky District, Ivanovo Oblast, Russia. Population: 224 (2010 census); 273 (2002 census);

== Geography ==
This rural locality is located 5 km from Vichuga (the district's administrative centre), 62 km from Ivanovo (capital of Ivanovo Oblast) and 306 km from Moscow. Yezhovka is the nearest rural locality.
