= Nikulino, Vichugsky District, Ivanovo Oblast =

Nikulino Никулино
- Village
- Location within Ivanovo Oblast Location within Russia
- Coordinates: 57°24′N 41°46′E
- Country: Russia
- Region: Ivanovo Oblast
- District: Vichugsky District
- Time zone: UTC+3:00

Nikulino (Russian: Никулино) is a rural locality (a village) in Vichugsky District, Ivanovo Oblast, Russia. Population: 10 (2010 census);

== Geography ==
This rural locality is located 25 km from Vichuga (the district's administrative centre), 67 km from Ivanovo (capital of Ivanovo Oblast) and 310 km from Moscow. Borshchevka is the nearest rural locality.
