= Staraya Golchikha =

Staraya Golchikha Старая Гольчиха
- Village
- Location within Ivanovo Oblast Location within Russia
- Coordinates: 57°11′N 41°51′E
- Country: Russia
- Region: Ivanovo Oblast
- District: Vichugsky District
- Time zone: UTC+3:00

Staraya Golchikha (Russian: Старая Гольчиха) is a rural locality (a village) in Vichugsky District, Ivanovo Oblast, Russia. Population: 163 (2010 census);

== Geography ==
This rural locality is located 4 km from Vichuga (the district's administrative centre), 58 km from Ivanovo (capital of Ivanovo Oblast) and 301 km from Moscow. Krasny Oktyabr is the nearest rural locality.
