= Shekholdino =

Shekholdino Шехолдино
- Village
- Location within Ivanovo Oblast Location within Russia
- Coordinates: 57°19′N 41°37′E
- Country: Russia
- Region: Ivanovo Oblast
- District: Vichugsky District
- Time zone: UTC+3:00

Shekholdino (Russian: Шехолдино) is a rural locality (a village) in Vichugsky District, Ivanovo Oblast, Russia. Population: 32 (2010 census);

== Geography ==
This rural locality is located 22 km from Vichuga (the district's administrative centre), 55 km from Ivanovo (capital of Ivanovo Oblast) and 298 km from Moscow. Zolotilovo is the nearest rural locality.
