= Kadyevo, Ivanovo Oblast =

Kadyevo Кадыево
- Village
- Location within Ivanovo Oblast Location within Russia
- Coordinates: 57°21′N 41°47′E
- Country: Russia
- Region: Ivanovo Oblast
- District: Vichugsky District
- Time zone: UTC+3:00

Kadyevo (Russian: Кадыево) is a rural locality (a village) in Vichugsky District, Ivanovo Oblast, Russia. Population: 13 (2010 census);

== Geography ==
This rural locality is located 19 km from Vichuga (the district's administrative centre), 64 km from Ivanovo (capital of Ivanovo Oblast) and 307 km from Moscow. Skomoroshki is the nearest rural locality.
