= Osinovka, Vichugsky District, Ivanovo Oblast =

Osinovka Осиновка
- Village
- Location within Ivanovo Oblast Location within Russia
- Coordinates: 57°16′N 41°39′E
- Country: Russia
- Region: Ivanovo Oblast
- District: Vichugsky District
- Time zone: UTC+3:00

Osinovka (Russian: Осиновка) is a rural locality (a village) in Vichugsky District, Ivanovo Oblast, Russia. Population: 13 (2010 census);

== Geography ==
This rural locality is located 18 km from Vichuga (the district's administrative centre), 51 km from Ivanovo (capital of Ivanovo Oblast) and 295 km from Moscow. Ovechkino is the nearest rural locality.
