= Gaydarovo Bolshoye =

Gaydarovo Bolshoye Гайдарово Большое
- Village
- Location within Ivanovo Oblast Location within Russia
- Coordinates: 57°12′N 42°09′E
- Country: Russia
- Region: Ivanovo Oblast
- District: Vichugsky District
- Time zone: UTC+3:00

Gaydarovo Bolshoye (Russian: Гайдарово Большое) is a rural locality (a village) in Vichugsky District, Ivanovo Oblast, Russia. Population: 40 (2010 census); 119 (2002 census);

== Geography ==
This rural locality is located 14 km from Vichuga (the district's administrative centre), 76 km from Ivanovo (capital of Ivanovo Oblast) and 318 km from Moscow. Krapivnova is the nearest rural locality.
