= Rokotovo =

Rokotovo Рокотово
- Village
- Location within Ivanovo Oblast Location within Russia
- Coordinates: 57°17′N 41°55′E
- Country: Russia
- Region: Ivanovo Oblast
- District: Vichugsky District
- Time zone: UTC+3:00

Rokotovo (Russian: Рокотово) is a rural locality (a village) in Vichugsky District, Ivanovo Oblast, Russia. Population: 40 (2010 census);

== Geography ==
This rural locality is located 10 km from Vichuga (the district's administrative centre), 67 km from Ivanovo (capital of Ivanovo Oblast) and 310 km from Moscow. Kosachevo is the nearest rural locality.
