= Pandino, Ivanovo Oblast =

Pandino Пандино
- Village
- Location within Ivanovo Oblast Location within Russia
- Coordinates: 57°11′N 41°59′E
- Country: Russia
- Region: Ivanovo Oblast
- District: Vichugsky District
- Time zone: UTC+3:00

Pandino (Russian: Пандино) is a rural locality (a village) in Vichugsky District, Ivanovo Oblast, Russia. Population: 10 (2010 census); 22 (2002 census);

== Geography ==
This rural locality is located 4 km from Vichuga (the district's administrative centre), 65 km from Ivanovo (capital of Ivanovo Oblast) and 308 km from Moscow. Fedyayevo is the nearest rural locality.
