= Zabolotye, Vichugsky District, Ivanovo Oblast =

Zabolotye Заболотье
- Village
- Location within Ivanovo Oblast Location within Russia
- Coordinates: 57°23′N 41°50′E
- Country: Russia
- Region: Ivanovo Oblast
- District: Vichugsky District
- Time zone: UTC+3:00

Zabolotye (Russian: Заболотье) is a rural locality (a village) in Vichugsky District, Ivanovo Oblast, Russia. Population: 34 (2010 census);

== Geography ==
This rural locality is located 21 km from Vichuga (the district's administrative centre), 69 km from Ivanovo (capital of Ivanovo Oblast) and 312 km from Moscow. Semigorye is the nearest rural locality.
