= Kuznetsovo, Vichugsky District, Ivanovo Oblast =

Kuznetsovo Кузнецово
- Village
- Location within Ivanovo Oblast Location within Russia
- Coordinates: 57°23′N 41°45′E
- Country: Russia
- Region: Ivanovo Oblast
- District: Vichugsky District
- Time zone: UTC+3:00

Kuznetsovo (Russian: Кузнецово) is a rural locality (a village) in Vichugsky District, Ivanovo Oblast, Russia. Population: 80 (2010 census); 127 (2002 census);

== Geography ==
This rural locality is located 22 km from Vichuga (the district's administrative centre), 64 km from Ivanovo (capital of Ivanovo Oblast) and 307 km from Moscow. Karabanovo is the nearest rural locality.
