= Zhiryatino =

One of several places in Russia

Zhiryatino (Russian: Жирятино) is the name of several rural localities in Russia:

- Zhiryatino, Bryansk Oblast, a selo in Zhiryatinsky Selsoviet of Zhiryatinsky District of Bryansk Oblast
- Zhiryatino, Ivanovo Oblast, a village in Vichugsky District of Ivanovo Oblast
- Zhiryatino, Kostroma Oblast, a village in Sudislavskoye Settlement of Sudislavsky District of Kostroma Oblast
- Zhiryatino, Oryol Oblast, a village in Krasnikovsky Selsoviet of Kromskoy District of Oryol Oblast
