= Yasnevo =

Yasnevo Яснево
- Village
- Location within Ivanovo Oblast Location within Russia
- Coordinates: 57°14′N 41°50′E
- Country: Russia
- Region: Ivanovo Oblast
- District: Vichugsky District
- Time zone: UTC+3:00

Yasnevo (Russian: Яснево) is a rural locality (a village) in Vichugsky District, Ivanovo Oblast, Russia. Population: 57 (2010 census);

== Geography ==
This rural locality is located 7 km from Vichuga (the district's administrative centre), 59 km from Ivanovo (capital of Ivanovo Oblast) and 303 km from Moscow. Rastvorovo is the nearest rural locality.
