= Rozhstvo =

Rozhstvo Рожство
- Village
- Location within Ivanovo Oblast Location within Russia
- Coordinates: 57°09′N 42°17′E
- Country: Russia
- Region: Ivanovo Oblast
- District: Vichugsky District
- Time zone: UTC+3:00

Rozhstvo (Russian: Рожство) is a rural locality (a village) in Vichugsky District, Ivanovo Oblast, Russia. Population: 7 (2010 census); 20 (2002 census);

== Geography ==
This rural locality is located 23 km from Vichuga (the district's administrative centre), 82 km from Ivanovo (capital of Ivanovo Oblast) and 322 km from Moscow. Ratmanikha is the nearest rural locality.
