= Vaskovo, Vichugsky District, Ivanovo Oblast =

Vaskovo Васьково
- Village
- Location within Ivanovo Oblast Location within Russia
- Coordinates: 57°21′N 41°51′E
- Country: Russia
- Region: Ivanovo Oblast
- District: Vichugsky District
- Time zone: UTC+3:00

Vaskovo (Russian: Васьково) is a rural locality (a village) in Vichugsky District, Ivanovo Oblast, Russia. Population: 6 (2010 census);

== Geography ==
This rural locality is located 16 km from Vichuga (the district's administrative centre), 66 km from Ivanovo (capital of Ivanovo Oblast) and 310 km from Moscow. Gridinskaya is the nearest rural locality.
