= Yanino, Ivanovo Oblast =

Yanino Янино
- Village
- Location within Ivanovo Oblast Location within Russia
- Coordinates: 57°12′N 41°57′E
- Country: Russia
- Region: Ivanovo Oblast
- District: Vichugsky District
- Time zone: UTC+3:00

Yanino (Russian: Янино) is a rural locality (a village) in Vichugsky District, Ivanovo Oblast, Russia. Population: 138 (2010 census);

== Geography ==
This rural locality is located 3 km from Vichuga (the district's administrative centre), 64 km from Ivanovo (capital of Ivanovo Oblast) and 307 km from Moscow. Pandino is the nearest rural locality.
