= Zolotilovo, Ivanovo Oblast =

Zolotilovo Золотилово
- Selo
- Location within Ivanovo Oblast Location within Russia
- Coordinates: 57°19′N 41°38′E
- Country: Russia
- Region: Ivanovo Oblast
- District: Vichugsky District
- Time zone: UTC+3:00

Zolotilovo (Russian: Золотилово) is a rural locality (a selo) in Vichugsky District, Ivanovo Oblast, Russia. Population: 227 (2010 census); 332 (2002 census);

== Geography ==
This rural locality is located 21 km from Vichuga (the district's administrative centre), 54 km from Ivanovo (capital of Ivanovo Oblast) and 298 km from Moscow. Shekholdino is the nearest rural locality.
