= Duravino, Ivanovo Oblast =

Duravino Дуравино
- Village
- Location within Ivanovo Oblast Location within Russia
- Coordinates: 57°13′N 42°02′E
- Country: Russia
- Region: Ivanovo Oblast
- District: Vichugsky District
- Time zone: UTC+3:00

Duravino (Russian: Дуравино) is a rural locality (a village) in Vichugsky District, Ivanovo Oblast, Russia. Population: 9 (2010 census); 8 (2002 census);

== Geography ==
This rural locality is located 7 km from Vichuga (the district's administrative centre), 69 km from Ivanovo (capital of Ivanovo Oblast) and 312 km from Moscow. Zherebtsovo is the nearest rural locality.
