= Korovino Verkhneye =

Korovino Verkhneye Коровино Верхнее
- Village
- Location within Ivanovo Oblast Location within Russia
- Coordinates: 57°11′N 42°12′E
- Country: Russia
- Region: Ivanovo Oblast
- District: Vichugsky District
- Time zone: UTC+3:00

Korovino Verkhneye (Russian: Коровино Верхнее) is a rural locality (a village) in Vichugsky District, Ivanovo Oblast, Russia. Population: 17 (2010 census); 20 (2002 census);

== Geography ==
This rural locality is located 17 km from Vichuga (the district's administrative centre), 78 km from Ivanovo (capital of Ivanovo Oblast) and 320 km from Moscow. Kharlamikha is the nearest rural locality.
