= Gridinskaya, Ivanovo Oblast =

Gridinskaya Гридинская
- Village
- Location within Ivanovo Oblast Location within Russia
- Coordinates: 57°20′N 41°50′E
- Country: Russia
- Region: Ivanovo Oblast
- District: Vichugsky District
- Time zone: UTC+3:00

Gridinskaya (Russian: Гридинская) is a rural locality (a village) in Vichugsky District, Ivanovo Oblast, Russia. Population: 26 (2010 census);

== Geography ==
This rural locality is located 16 km from Vichuga (the district's administrative centre), 65 km from Ivanovo (capital of Ivanovo Oblast) and 309 km from Moscow. Krasnye Gory is the nearest rural locality.
