= Zolotovka =

Zolotovka (Russian: Золотовка) is the name of several rural localities in Russia:

- Zolotovka, Ivanovo Oblast, a village in Vichugsky District of Ivanovo Oblast
- Zolotovka, Kurgan Oblast, a village in Novogeorgiyevsky Selsoviet of Petukhovsky District in Kurgan Oblast; 55°17′N 67°53′E
- Zolotovka, Saratov Oblast, a selo in Marksovsky District of Saratov Oblast
- Zolotovka, Tambov Oblast, a selo in Zolotovsky Selsoviet of Rzhaksinsky District in Tambov Oblast
