= Ankino =

Ankino Анкино
- Village
- Location within Ivanovo Oblast Location within Russia
- Coordinates: 57°22′N 41°46′E
- Country: Russia
- Region: Ivanovo Oblast
- District: Vichugsky District
- Time zone: UTC+3:00

Ankino (Russian: Анкино) is a rural locality (a village) in Vichugsky District, Ivanovo Oblast, Russia. Population: 7 (2010 census);

== Geography ==
This rural locality is located 20 km from Vichuga (the district's administrative centre), 64 km from Ivanovo (capital of Ivanovo Oblast) and 307 km from Moscow. Glukhovo is the nearest rural locality.
