= Bulatikha =

Bulatikha Булатиха
- Village
- Location within Ivanovo Oblast Location within Russia
- Coordinates: 57°08′N 42°08′E
- Country: Russia
- Region: Ivanovo Oblast
- District: Vichugsky District
- Time zone: UTC+3:00

Bulatikha (Russian: Булатиха) is a rural locality (a village) in Vichugsky District, Ivanovo Oblast, Russia. Population: 18 (2010 census); 35 (2002 census);

== Geography ==
This rural locality is located 15 km from Vichuga (the district's administrative centre), 72 km from Ivanovo (capital of Ivanovo Oblast) and 313 km from Moscow. Lazunikha is the nearest rural locality.
