= Krasny Oktyabr, Ivanovo Oblast =

Krasny Oktyabr Красный Октябрь
- Selo
- Location within Ivanovo Oblast Location within Russia
- Coordinates: 57°11′N 41°51′E
- Country: Russia
- Region: Ivanovo Oblast
- District: Vichugsky District
- Time zone: UTC+3:00

Krasny Oktyabr (Russian: Красный Октябрь) is a rural locality (a selo) in Vichugsky District, Ivanovo Oblast, Russia. Population: 395 (2010 census); 379 (2002 census);

== Geography ==
This rural locality is located 4 km from Vichuga (the district's administrative centre), 58 km from Ivanovo (capital of Ivanovo Oblast) and 301 km from Moscow. Kirikino is the nearest rural locality.
