= Lemeshikha =

Lemeshikha Лемешиха
- Village
- Location within Ivanovo Oblast Location within Russia
- Coordinates: 57°21′N 41°51′E
- Country: Russia
- Region: Ivanovo Oblast
- District: Vichugsky District
- Time zone: UTC+3:00

Lemeshikha (Russian: Лемешиха) is a rural locality (a village) in Vichugsky District, Ivanovo Oblast, Russia. Population: 6 (2010 census);

== Geography ==
This rural locality is located 17 km from Vichuga (the district's administrative centre), 67 km from Ivanovo (capital of Ivanovo Oblast) and 311 km from Moscow. Vaskovo is the nearest rural locality.
