= Lukhovets =

Lukhovets Луховец
- Village
- Location within Ivanovo Oblast Location within Russia
- Coordinates: 57°23′N 41°45′E
- Country: Russia
- Region: Ivanovo Oblast
- District: Vichugsky District
- Time zone: UTC+3:00

Lukhovets (Russian: Луховец) is a rural locality (a village) in Vichugsky District, Ivanovo Oblast, Russia. Population: 21 (2010 census);

== Geography ==
This rural locality is located 23 km from Vichuga (the district's administrative centre), 66 km from Ivanovo (capital of Ivanovo Oblast) and 308 km from Moscow. Sunzha is the nearest rural locality.
