= Pistsovo Novoye =

Pistsovo Novoye Писцово Новое
- Village
- Location within Ivanovo Oblast Location within Russia
- Coordinates: 57°08′N 42°20′E
- Country: Russia
- Region: Ivanovo Oblast
- District: Vichugsky District
- Time zone: UTC+3:00

Pistsovo Novoye (Russian: Писцово Новое) is a rural locality (a village) in Vichugsky District, Ivanovo Oblast, Russia. Population: 26 (2010 census); 68 (2002 census);

== Geography ==
This rural locality is located 26 km from Vichuga (the district's administrative centre), 84 km from Ivanovo (capital of Ivanovo Oblast) and 324 km from Moscow. Ustinovo is the nearest rural locality.
