= Tolkovo =

Tolkovo Тольково
- Village
- Location within Ivanovo Oblast Location within Russia
- Coordinates: 57°14′N 41°57′E
- Country: Russia
- Region: Ivanovo Oblast
- District: Vichugsky District
- Time zone: UTC+3:00

Tolkovo (Russian: Тольково) is a rural locality (a village) in Vichugsky District, Ivanovo Oblast, Russia. Population: 17 (2010 census); 29 (2002 census);

== Geography ==
This rural locality is located 4 km from Vichuga (the district's administrative centre), 66 km from Ivanovo (capital of Ivanovo Oblast) and 309 km from Moscow. Dolmatikha is the nearest rural locality.
