= Zherebtsovo =

Zherebtsovo Жеребцово
- Village
- Location within Ivanovo Oblast Location within Russia
- Coordinates: 57°12′N 42°00′E
- Country: Russia
- Region: Ivanovo Oblast
- District: Vichugsky District
- Time zone: UTC+3:00

Zherebtsovo (Russian: Жеребцово) is a rural locality (a village) in Vichugsky District, Ivanovo Oblast, Russia. Population: 11 (2010 census); 7 (2002 census);

== Geography ==
This rural locality is located 6 km from Vichuga (the district's administrative centre), 68 km from Ivanovo (capital of Ivanovo Oblast) and 311 km from Moscow. Yurino is the nearest rural locality.
