= Borodkino, Ivanovo Oblast =

Borodkino Бородкино
- Village
- Location within Ivanovo Oblast Location within Russia
- Coordinates: 57°17′N 41°37′E
- Country: Russia
- Region: Ivanovo Oblast
- District: Vichugsky District
- Time zone: UTC+3:00

Borodkino (Russian: Бородкино) is a rural locality (a village) in Vichugsky District, Ivanovo Oblast, Russia. Population: 12 (2010 census);

== Geography ==
This rural locality is located 20 km from Vichuga (the district's administrative centre), 52 km from Ivanovo (capital of Ivanovo Oblast) and 295 km from Moscow. Vasilkovo is the nearest rural locality.
