= Makatovo =

Makatovo Макатово
- Village
- Location within Ivanovo Oblast Location within Russia
- Coordinates: 57°07′N 42°03′E
- Country: Russia
- Region: Ivanovo Oblast
- District: Vichugsky District
- Time zone: UTC+3:00

Makatovo (Russian: Макатово) is a rural locality (a village) in Vichugsky District, Ivanovo Oblast, Russia. Population: 36 (2010 census); 32 (2002 census);

== Geography ==
This rural locality is located 12 km from Vichuga (the district's administrative centre), 68 km from Ivanovo (capital of Ivanovo Oblast) and 308 km from Moscow. Sorokino is the nearest rural locality.
