= Dolmatikha =

Dolmatikha Долматиха
- Village
- Location within Ivanovo Oblast Location within Russia
- Coordinates: 57°13′N 41°58′E
- Country: Russia
- Region: Ivanovo Oblast
- District: Vichugsky District
- Time zone: UTC+3:00

Dolmatikha (Russian: Долматиха) is a rural locality (a village) in Vichugsky District, Ivanovo Oblast, Russia. Population: 12 (2010 census); 36 (2002 census);

== Geography ==
This rural locality is located 4 km from Vichuga (the district's administrative centre), 66 km from Ivanovo (capital of Ivanovo Oblast) and 310 km from Moscow. Soshniki is the nearest rural locality.
