= Isupovskaya =

Isupovskaya Исуповская
- Village
- Location within Ivanovo Oblast Location within Russia
- Coordinates: 57°17′N 42°01′E
- Country: Russia
- Region: Ivanovo Oblast
- District: Vichugsky District
- Time zone: UTC+3:00

Isupovskaya (Russian: Исуповская) is a rural locality (a village) in Vichugsky District, Ivanovo Oblast, Russia. Population: 5 (2010 census); 7 (2002 census);

== Geography ==
This rural locality is located 12 km from Vichuga (the district's administrative centre), 72 km from Ivanovo (capital of Ivanovo Oblast) and 316 km from Moscow. Babino is the nearest rural locality.
