= Demidovo, Vichugsky District, Ivanovo Oblast =

Demidovo Демидово
- Village
- Location within Ivanovo Oblast Location within Russia
- Coordinates: 57°16′N 41°51′E
- Country: Russia
- Region: Ivanovo Oblast
- District: Vichugsky District
- Time zone: UTC+3:00

Demidovo (Russian: Демидово) is a rural locality (a village) in Vichugsky District, Ivanovo Oblast, Russia. Population: 31 (2010 census);

== Geography ==
This rural locality is located 8 km from Vichuga (the district's administrative centre), 62 km from Ivanovo (capital of Ivanovo Oblast) and 306 km from Moscow. Yashino is the nearest rural locality.
