= Razdolye, Ivanovo Oblast =

Razdolye Раздолье
- Village
- Location within Ivanovo Oblast Location within Russia
- Coordinates: 57°08′N 42°04′E
- Country: Russia
- Region: Ivanovo Oblast
- District: Vichugsky District
- Time zone: UTC+3:00

Razdolye (Russian: Раздолье) is a rural locality (a village) in Vichugsky District, Ivanovo Oblast, Russia. Population: 101 (2010 census);

== Geography ==
This rural locality is located 12 km from Vichuga (the district's administrative centre), 69 km from Ivanovo (capital of Ivanovo Oblast) and 310 km from Moscow. Klyushino is the nearest rural locality.
