= Stepanikha, Ivanovo Oblast =

Stepanikha Степаниха
- Village
- Location within Ivanovo Oblast Location within Russia
- Coordinates: 57°21′N 41°52′E
- Country: Russia
- Region: Ivanovo Oblast
- District: Vichugsky District
- Time zone: UTC+3:00

Stepanikha (Russian: Степаниха) is a rural locality (a village) in Vichugsky District, Ivanovo Oblast, Russia. Population: 11 (2010 census);

== Geography ==
This rural locality is located 17 km from Vichuga (the district's administrative centre), 68 km from Ivanovo (capital of Ivanovo Oblast) and 311 km from Moscow. Lemeshikha is the nearest rural locality.
