= Chertovishchi =

Chertovishchi Чертовищи
- Village
- Location within Ivanovo Oblast Location within Russia
- Coordinates: 57°17′N 41°52′E
- Country: Russia
- Region: Ivanovo Oblast
- District: Vichugsky District
- Time zone: UTC+3:00

Chertovishchi (Russian: Чертовищи) is a rural locality (a village) in Vichugsky District, Ivanovo Oblast, Russia. Population: 983 (2010 census);

== Geography ==
This rural locality is located 10 km from Vichuga (the district's administrative centre), 65 km from Ivanovo (capital of Ivanovo Oblast) and 308 km from Moscow. Bystri is the nearest rural locality.
