= Dyagelikha =

Dyagelikha Дягелиха
- Village
- Location within Ivanovo Oblast Location within Russia
- Coordinates: 57°20′N 41°58′E
- Country: Russia
- Region: Ivanovo Oblast
- District: Vichugsky District
- Time zone: UTC+3:00

Dyagelikha (Russian: Дягелиха) is a rural locality (a village) in Vichugsky District, Ivanovo Oblast, Russia. Population: 35 (2010 census);

== Geography ==
This rural locality is located 15 km from Vichuga (the district's administrative centre), 72 km from Ivanovo (capital of Ivanovo Oblast) and 315 km from Moscow. Nastasyino is the nearest rural locality.
