= Starostino, Vichugsky District, Ivanovo Oblast =

Starostino Старостино
- Village
- Location within Ivanovo Oblast Location within Russia
- Coordinates: 57°15′N 41°42′E
- Country: Russia
- Region: Ivanovo Oblast
- District: Vichugsky District
- Time zone: UTC+3:00

Starostino (Russian: Старостино) is a rural locality (a village) in Vichugsky District, Ivanovo Oblast, Russia. Population: 20 (2010 census);

== Geography ==
This rural locality is located 14 km from Vichuga (the district's administrative centre), 54 km from Ivanovo (capital of Ivanovo Oblast) and 298 km from Moscow. Gavrilkovo is the nearest rural locality.
