= Soshniki =

Soshniki Сошники
- Village
- Location within Ivanovo Oblast Location within Russia
- Coordinates: 57°14′N 42°00′E
- Country: Russia
- Region: Ivanovo Oblast
- District: Vichugsky District
- Time zone: UTC+3:00

Soshniki (Russian: Сошники) is a rural locality (a village) in Vichugsky District, Ivanovo Oblast, Russia. Population: 473 (2010 census); 544 (2002 census);

== Geography ==
This rural locality is located 6 km from Vichuga (the district's administrative centre), 68 km from Ivanovo (capital of Ivanovo Oblast) and 311 km from Moscow. Dolmatikha is the nearest rural locality.
