= Borshchevka, Vichugsky District, Ivanovo Oblast =

Borshchevka Борщевка
- Village
- Location within Ivanovo Oblast Location within Russia
- Coordinates: 57°24′N 41°47′E
- Country: Russia
- Region: Ivanovo Oblast
- District: Vichugsky District
- Time zone: UTC+3:00

Borshchevka (Russian: Борщевка) is a rural locality (a village) in Vichugsky District, Ivanovo Oblast, Russia. Population: 22 (2010 census); 19 (2002 census);

== Geography ==
This rural locality is located 23 km from Vichuga (the district's administrative centre), 68 km from Ivanovo (capital of Ivanovo Oblast) and 310 km from Moscow. Strelka is the nearest rural locality.
