= Zakharikha, Vichugsky District, Ivanovo Oblast =

Zakharikha Захариха
- Village
- Location within Ivanovo Oblast Location within Russia
- Coordinates: 57°09′N 41°50′E
- Country: Russia
- Region: Ivanovo Oblast
- District: Vichugsky District
- Time zone: UTC+3:00

Zakharikha (Russian: Захариха) is a rural locality (a village) in Vichugsky District, Ivanovo Oblast, Russia. Population: 15 (2010 census);

== Geography ==
This rural locality is located 7 km from Vichuga (the district's administrative centre), 56 km from Ivanovo (capital of Ivanovo Oblast) and 299 km from Moscow. Sopegino is the nearest rural locality.
