= Siniye Gari =

Siniye Gari Синие Гари
- Village
- Location within Ivanovo Oblast Location within Russia
- Coordinates: 57°13′N 41°45′E
- Country: Russia
- Region: Ivanovo Oblast
- District: Vichugsky District
- Time zone: UTC+3:00

Siniye Gari (Russian: Синие Гари) is a rural locality (a village) in Vichugsky District, Ivanovo Oblast, Russia. Population: 60 (2010 census);

== Geography ==
This rural locality is located 10 km from Vichuga (the district's administrative centre), 54 km from Ivanovo (capital of Ivanovo Oblast) and 298 km from Moscow. Terekhovo is the nearest rural locality.
