= Zarubino, Vichugsky District, Ivanovo Oblast =

Zarubino Зарубино
- Village
- Location within Ivanovo Oblast Location within Russia
- Coordinates: 57°09′N 42°04′E
- Country: Russia
- Region: Ivanovo Oblast
- District: Vichugsky District
- Time zone: UTC+3:00

Zarubino (Russian: Зарубино) is a rural locality (a village) in Vichugsky District, Ivanovo Oblast, Russia. Population: 111 (2010 census); 167 (2002 census);

== Geography ==
This rural locality is located 11 km from Vichuga (the district's administrative centre), 70 km from Ivanovo (capital of Ivanovo Oblast) and 311 km from Moscow. Shaldovo is the nearest rural locality.
