= Nefyodovo =

Nefyodovo Нефёдово
- Village
- Location within Ivanovo Oblast Location within Russia
- Coordinates: 57°14′N 41°53′E
- Country: Russia
- Region: Ivanovo Oblast
- District: Vichugsky District
- Time zone: UTC+3:00

Nefyodovo (Russian: Нефёдово) is a rural locality (a village) in Vichugsky District, Ivanovo Oblast, Russia. Population: 18 (2010 census);

== Geography ==
This rural locality is located 3 km from Vichuga (the district's administrative centre), 61 km from Ivanovo (capital of Ivanovo Oblast) and 305 km from Moscow. Rychkovskaya is the nearest rural locality.
