= Gavrilkovo, Vichugsky District, Ivanovo Oblast =

Gavrilkovo Гаврилково
- Village
- Location within Ivanovo Oblast Location within Russia
- Coordinates: 57°15′N 41°42′E
- Country: Russia
- Region: Ivanovo Oblast
- District: Vichugsky District
- Time zone: UTC+3:00

Gavrilkovo (Russian: Гаврилково) is a rural locality (a village) in Vichugsky District, Ivanovo Oblast, Russia. Population: 279 (2010 census); 350 (2002 census);

== Geography ==
This rural locality is located 14 km from Vichuga (the district's administrative centre), 53 km from Ivanovo (capital of Ivanovo Oblast) and 297 km from Moscow. Starostino is the nearest rural locality.
