= Zalesye, Vichugsky District, Ivanovo Oblast =

Zalesye Залесье
- Village
- Location within Ivanovo Oblast Location within Russia
- Coordinates: 57°11′N 42°04′E
- Country: Russia
- Region: Ivanovo Oblast
- District: Vichugsky District
- Time zone: UTC+3:00

Zalesye (Russian: Залесье) is a rural locality (a village) in Vichugsky District, Ivanovo Oblast, Russia. Population: 18 (2010 census);

== Geography ==
This rural locality is located 9 km from Vichuga (the district's administrative centre), 70 km from Ivanovo (capital of Ivanovo Oblast) and 313 km from Moscow. Yurino is the nearest rural locality.
