= Artyushino, Ivanovo Oblast =

Artyushino Артюшино
- Village
- Location within Ivanovo Oblast Location within Russia
- Coordinates: 57°17′N 41°52′E
- Country: Russia
- Region: Ivanovo Oblast
- District: Vichugsky District
- Time zone: UTC+3:00

Artyushino (Russian: Артюшино) is a rural locality (a village) in Vichugsky District, Ivanovo Oblast, Russia. Population: 140 (2010 census);

== Geography ==
This rural locality is located 9 km from Vichuga (the district's administrative centre), 64 km from Ivanovo (capital of Ivanovo Oblast) and 307 km from Moscow. Chertovishchi is the nearest rural locality.
