= Vekhtevo =

Vekhtevo Вехтево
- Village
- Location within Ivanovo Oblast Location within Russia
- Coordinates: 57°19′N 41°52′E
- Country: Russia
- Region: Ivanovo Oblast
- District: Vichugsky District
- Time zone: UTC+3:00

Vekhtevo (Russian: Вехтево) is a rural locality (a village) in Vichugsky District, Ivanovo Oblast, Russia. Population: 5 (2010 census);

== Geography ==
This rural locality is located 12 km from Vichuga (the district's administrative centre), 66 km from Ivanovo (capital of Ivanovo Oblast) and 309 km from Moscow. Savinskaya is the nearest rural locality.
