= Kashino, Vichugsky District, Ivanovo Oblast =

Kashino Кашино
- Village
- Location within Ivanovo Oblast Location within Russia
- Coordinates: 57°07′N 42°06′E
- Country: Russia
- Region: Ivanovo Oblast
- District: Vichugsky District
- Time zone: UTC+3:00

Kashino (Russian: Кашино) is a rural locality (a village) in Vichugsky District, Ivanovo Oblast, Russia. Population: 30 (2010 census); 59 (2002 census);

== Geography ==
This rural locality is located 15 km from Vichuga (the district's administrative centre), 70 km from Ivanovo (capital of Ivanovo Oblast) and 311 km from Moscow. Sonino is the nearest rural locality.
