= Okulovo, Vichugsky District, Ivanovo Oblast =

Okulovo Окулово
- Village
- Location within Ivanovo Oblast Location within Russia
- Coordinates: 57°07′N 42°10′E
- Country: Russia
- Region: Ivanovo Oblast
- District: Vichugsky District
- Time zone: UTC+3:00

Okulovo (Russian: Окулово) is a rural locality (a village) in Vichugsky District, Ivanovo Oblast, Russia. Population: 16 (2010 census); 32 (2002 census);

== Geography ==
This rural locality is located 18 km from Vichuga (the district's administrative centre), 74 km from Ivanovo (capital of Ivanovo Oblast) and 314 km from Moscow. Voroshilikha is the nearest rural locality.
