= Krasnye Gory =

Krasnye Gory Красные Горы
- Village
- Location within Ivanovo Oblast Location within Russia
- Coordinates: 57°20′N 41°49′E
- Country: Russia
- Region: Ivanovo Oblast
- District: Vichugsky District
- Time zone: UTC+3:00

Krasnye Gory (Russian: Красные Горы) is a rural locality (a village) in Vichugsky District, Ivanovo Oblast, Russia. Population: 16 (2010 census);

== Geography ==
This rural locality is located 16 km from Vichuga (the district's administrative centre), 64 km from Ivanovo (capital of Ivanovo Oblast) and 308 km from Moscow. Nasakino is the nearest rural locality.
