= Ivan Vasilyev (politician) =

- Иван Васильев

Member of the State Duma
- In office 7 December 2003 – 24 December 2007

Personal details
- Born: Ivan Afanasyevich Vasilyev; 3 July 1963 Verkhniy Yaseniv, Ukrainian SFSR, Soviet Union
- Died: 21 January 2009 (aged 45) Glukhovo, Moscow Oblast, Russia
- Party: United Russia

Ivan Afanasyevich Vasilyev (Russian: Иван Афанасьевич Васильев; 3 July 1963 - 21 January 2009), was a Ukrainian-born Russian politician who served as a member the State Duma from 2003 to 2007.

== Biography ==
Ivan Vasilyev was born in Verkhniy Yaseniv on 3 July 1963.

He graduated from the Kherson Sudomekhaniy College, the Academy of the State Service, the Institute of State and Municipal Service. He was a mechanic in the Baltic Shipping Company. From 1984 to 1988, he worked at the USSR Embassy in Poland, and subsequently engaged in trade and restaurant business.

From 1994 to 2003, he was the general director of the State Unitary Enterprise “Tsaritsynsky Market Complex” in Moscow.

On 7 December 2003, Vasiylev was elected to the State Duma of the fourth convocation in the Tambov single -mandate district.

On 21 January 2009, he shot himself from a hunting carbine in a cottage rented by him in the village of Glukhovo, Krasnogorsk district of the Moscow region, where he lived with his wife and son.
