= Glukhovo =

Glukhovo (Russian: Глухово) is the name of several rural localities in Russia.

== Ivanovo Oblast ==
As of 2010, two rural localities in Ivanovo Oblast bear this name:

- Glukhovo, Kineshemsky District, Ivanovo Oblast, a village in Kineshemsky District
- Glukhovo, Vichugsky District, Ivanovo Oblast, a village in Vichugsky District

== Kaluga Oblast ==
As of 2010, one rural locality in Kaluga Oblast bears this name:

- Glukhovo, Kaluga Oblast, a village in Medynsky District

== Kostroma Oblast ==
As of 2010, one rural locality in Kostroma Oblast bears this name:

- Glukhovo, Kostroma Oblast, a village in Dmitriyevskoye Settlement of Galichsky District

== Leningrad Oblast ==
As of 2010, one rural locality in Leningrad Oblast bears this name:

- Glukhovo, Leningrad Oblast, a village in Kipenskoye Settlement Municipal Formation of Lomonosovsky District

== Moscow Oblast ==
As of 2010, four rural localities in Moscow Oblast bear this name:

- Glukhovo, Sinkovskoye Rural Settlement, Dmitrovsky District, Moscow Oblast, a village in Sinkovskoye Rural Settlement of Dmitrovsky District
- Glukhovo, Yakhroma, Dmitrovsky District, Moscow Oblast, a village under the administrative jurisdiction of the Town of Yakhroma in Dmitrovsky District
- Glukhovo, Krasnogorsky District, Moscow Oblast, a village in Ilyinskoye Rural Settlement of Krasnogorsky District
- Glukhovo, Ruzsky District, Moscow Oblast, a village in Staroruzskoye Rural Settlement of Ruzsky District

== Nizhny Novgorod Oblast ==
As of 2010, two rural localities in Nizhny Novgorod Oblast bear this name:

- Glukhovo, Diveyevsky District, Nizhny Novgorod Oblast, a selo in Glukhovsky Selsoviet of Diveyevsky District
- Glukhovo, Voskresensky District, Nizhny Novgorod Oblast, a selo in Glukhovsky Selsoviet of Voskresensky District

== Novgorod Oblast ==
As of 2010, two rural localities in Novgorod Oblast bear this name:

- Glukhovo, Batetsky District, Novgorod Oblast, a village in Batetskoye Settlement of Batetsky District
- Glukhovo, Okulovsky District, Novgorod Oblast, a village in Borovenkovskoye Settlement of Okulovsky District

== Pskov Oblast ==
As of 2010, three rural localities in Pskov Oblast bear this name:

- Glukhovo, Loknyansky District, Pskov Oblast, a village in Loknyansky District
- Glukhovo, Novorzhevsky District, Pskov Oblast, a village in Novorzhevsky District
- Glukhovo, Pushkinogorsky District, Pskov Oblast, a village in Pushkinogorsky District

== Smolensk Oblast ==
As of 2010, two rural localities in Smolensk Oblast bear this name:

- Glukhovo, Smolensky District, Smolensk Oblast, a village in Pionerskoye Rural Settlement of Smolensky District
- Glukhovo, Ugransky District, Smolensk Oblast, a village in Zhelanyinskoye Rural Settlement of Ugransky District

== Republic of Tatarstan ==
As of 2010, one rural locality in the Republic of Tatarstan bears this name:

- Glukhovo, Republic of Tatarstan, a village in Vysokogorsky District

== Tver Oblast ==
As of 2010, four rural localities in Tver Oblast bear this name:

- Glukhovo, Kesovogorsky District, Tver Oblast, a village in Kesovogorsky District
- Glukhovo, Kimrsky District, Tver Oblast, a village in Kimrsky District
- Glukhovo (Ostashkovskoye Rural Settlement), Torzhoksky District, Tver Oblast, a village in Torzhoksky District; municipally, a part of Ostashkovskoye Rural Settlement of that district
- Glukhovo (Vysokovskoye Rural Settlement), Torzhoksky District, Tver Oblast, a village in Torzhoksky District; municipally, a part of Vysokovskoye Rural Settlement of that district

== Udmurt Republic ==
As of 2010, one rural locality in the Udmurt Republic bears this name:

- Glukhovo, Udmurt Republic, a village in Kigbayevsky Selsoviet of Sarapulsky District

== Vladimir Oblast ==
As of 2010, one rural locality in Vladimir Oblast bears this name:

- Glukhovo, Vladimir Oblast, a selo in Sobinsky District

== Yaroslavl Oblast ==
As of 2010, two rural localities in Yaroslavl Oblast bear this name:

- Glukhovo, Uglichsky District, Yaroslavl Oblast, a village in Uleyminsky Rural Okrug of Uglichsky District
- Glukhovo, Yaroslavsky District, Yaroslavl Oblast, a village in Pestretsovsky Rural Okrug of Yaroslavsky District
