= Glukhovo, Vichugsky District, Ivanovo Oblast =

Glukhovo Глухово
- Village
- Location within Ivanovo Oblast Location within Russia
- Coordinates: 57°21′N 41°45′E
- Country: Russia
- Region: Ivanovo Oblast
- District: Vichugsky District
- Time zone: UTC+3:00

Glukhovo (Russian: Глухово) is a rural locality (a village) in Vichugsky District, Ivanovo Oblast, Russia. Population: 5 (2010 census);

== Geography ==
This rural locality is located 19 km from Vichuga (the district's administrative centre), 63 km from Ivanovo (capital of Ivanovo Oblast) and 306 km from Moscow. Skomoroshki is the nearest rural locality.
