= Zhiryatino, Ivanovo Oblast =

Zhiryatino Жирятино
- Village
- Location within Ivanovo Oblast Location within Russia
- Coordinates: 57°22′N 41°53′E
- Country: Russia
- Region: Ivanovo Oblast
- District: Vichugsky District
- Time zone: UTC+3:00

Zhiryatino (Russian: Жирятино) is a rural locality (a village) in Vichugsky District, Ivanovo Oblast, Russia. Population: 84 (2010 census); 80 (2002 census);

== Geography ==
This rural locality is located 18 km from Vichuga (the district's administrative centre), 70 km from Ivanovo (capital of Ivanovo Oblast) and 313 km from Moscow. Stepanikha is the nearest rural locality.
