= Zolotovka, Ivanovo Oblast =

Zolotovka Золотовка
- Village
- Location within Ivanovo Oblast Location within Russia
- Coordinates: 57°15′N 41°40′E
- Country: Russia
- Region: Ivanovo Oblast
- District: Vichugsky District
- Time zone: UTC+3:00

Zolotovka (Russian: Золотовка) is a rural locality (a village) in Vichugsky District, Ivanovo Oblast, Russia. Population: 17 (2010 census);

== Geography ==
This rural locality is located 16 km from Vichuga (the district's administrative centre), 52 km from Ivanovo (capital of Ivanovo Oblast) and 296 km from Moscow. Kopylikha is the nearest rural locality.
