= Sergei Smorgachyov =

Russian footballer

Personal information
- Full name: Sergei Borisovich Smorgachyov
- Date of birth: 30 March 1968 (age 58)
- Place of birth: Moscow, Russian SFSR
- Height: 1.79 m (5 ft 10 1/2 in)
- Positions: Defender; midfielder

Youth career
- FC Spartak Moscow

Senior career*
Years	Team	Apps	(Gls)
1986	FC Spartak Moscow	0	(0)
1986–1987	FC Dynamo Moscow	0	(0)
1987–1988	FC Dynamo-2 Moscow	32	(0)
1989	FC Spartak Moscow	0	(0)
1989–1995	FC Shinnik Yaroslavl	185	(4)
1996–1997	FC Avtomobilist Noginsk	72	(1)
1998	FC Mosenergo Moscow	28	(0)
2001	FC Nosorogi Volodarskogo		
- * Club domestic league appearances and goals

Sergei Borisovich Smorgachyov (Russian: Сергей Борисович Сморгачёв; born 30 March 1968 in Moscow) is a former Russian football player.

He played one game for the main squad of FC Spartak Moscow in the USSR Federation Cup.
