= Yevgeni Bodrov =

Russian professional ice hockey player

- Born: January 8, 1988 (age 38) Togliatti, Russian SFSR, Soviet Union
- Height: 6 ft 2 in (188 cm)
- Weight: 190 lb (86 kg; 13 st 8 lb)
- Position: Centre
- Shot: Left
- Played for: Lada Togliatti; Ak Bars Kazan; Atlant Moscow Oblast; Spartak Moscow; Salavat Yulaev Ufa; Sibir Novosibirsk; Severstal Cherepovets
- Playing career: 2005–2023

Yevgeni Bodrov (born January 8, 1988) is a Russian former professional ice hockey player who played in the Kontinental Hockey League (KHL).

After five seasons with Ak Bars Kazan, Bodrov was traded during the 2014–15 season, to Atlant Moscow Oblast in exchange for Mikhail Glukhov on November 20, 2014.

Following an 18-year professional career, Bodrov announced his retirement from professional hockey due to a lingering hip injury on 14 September 2023.

== Career statistics ==
=== Regular season and playoffs ===
			Regular season					Playoffs
Season	Team	League	GP	G	A	Pts	PIM	GP	G	A	Pts	PIM
2005–06	Lada Togliatti	RSL	18	0	1	1	8	2	0	0	0	0
2006–07	Lada Togliatti	RSL	36	2	1	3	22	2	0	0	0	0
2007–08	Lada Togliatti	RSL	34	6	12	18	48	4	0	0	0	2
2008–09	Lada Togliatti	KHL	56	5	8	13	52	5	1	0	1	6
2009–10	Lada Togliatti	KHL	14	3	10	13	18	—	—	—	—	—
2009–10	Ak Bars Kazan	KHL	41	5	7	12	8	21	0	4	4	14
2010–11	Ak Bars Kazan	KHL	52	4	7	11	28	9	0	0	0	2
2011–12	Ak Bars Kazan	KHL	54	7	8	15	30	12	2	0	2	2
2012–13	Ak Bars Kazan	KHL	34	0	3	3	16	15	0	2	2	6
2013–14	Ak Bars Kazan	KHL	28	3	3	6	28	6	0	0	0	2
2014–15	Ak Bars Kazan	KHL	13	2	1	3	16	—	—	—	—	—
2014–15	Atlant Moscow Oblast	KHL	32	3	6	9	8	—	—	—	—	—
2015–16	Spartak Moscow	KHL	59	8	16	24	55	—	—	—	—	—
2016–17	Salavat Yulaev Ufa	KHL	51	8	15	23	45	5	0	0	0	2
2017–18	Salavat Yulaev Ufa	KHL	20	2	3	5	12	—	—	—	—	—
2017–18	Sibir Novosibirsk	KHL	21	0	1	1	4	—	—	—	—	—
2018–19	Sibir Novosibirsk	KHL	19	1	2	3	29	—	—	—	—	—
2018–19	Severstal Cherepovets	KHL	21	1	3	4	4	—	—	—	—	—
2019–20	Severstal Cherepovets	KHL	33	2	2	4	22	—	—	—	—	—
2020–21	Lada Togliatti	VHL	14	3	2	5	6	—	—	—	—	—
2021–22	Cracovia Krakow	PHL	40	12	23	35	32	6	2	3	5	0
2022–23	Lada Togliatti	VHL	14	4	4	8	12	—	—	—	—	—
RSL totals			88	8	14	22	78	8	0	0	0	2
KHL totals			548	54	95	149	375	73	3	6	9	34

=== International ===
Year	Team	Event	Result	GP	G	A	Pts	PIM
2006	Russia	WJC18	5th	6	2	2	4	14
2008	Russia	WJC	3rd place, bronze medalist(s)	7	1	3	4	6
Junior totals				13	3	5	8	20
