= Semigorye, Ivanovo Oblast =

Semigorye Семигорье
- Village
- Location within Ivanovo Oblast Location within Russia
- Coordinates: 57°23′N 41°49′E
- Country: Russia
- Region: Ivanovo Oblast
- District: Vichugsky District
- Time zone: UTC+3:00

Semigorye (Russian: Семигорье) is a rural locality (a village) in Vichugsky District, Ivanovo Oblast, Russia. Population: 809 (2010 census); 831 (2002 census);

== Geography ==
This rural locality is located 21 km from Vichuga (the district's administrative centre), 67 km from Ivanovo (capital of Ivanovo Oblast) and 310 km from Moscow. Otradnoye is the nearest rural locality.
