= Glukhovka =

Glukhovka Глуховка
- Selo
- Interactive map of Glukhovka
- Location within Belgorod Oblast Location within Russia
- Coordinates: 50°43′N 38°41′E
- Country: Russia
- Region: Belgorod Oblast
- District: Alexeyevsky District
- Time zone: UTC+3:00

Glukhovka (Russian: Глуховка) is a rural locality (a selo) and the administrative center of Glukhovskoye Rural Settlement, Alexeyevsky District, Belgorod Oblast, Russia. The population was 939 as of 2010. There are 13 streets.

== Geography ==
Glukhovka is located 14 km north of Alexeyevka (the district's administrative centre) by road. Gorodishche is the nearest rural locality.
