= Glukhovo, Vladimir Oblast =

Glukhovo Глухово
- Selo
- Location within Vladimir Oblast Location within Russia
- Coordinates: 56°07′N 39°50′E
- Country: Russia
- Region: Vladimir Oblast
- District: Sobinsky District
- Time zone: UTC+3:00

Glukhovo (Russian: Глухово) is a rural locality (a selo) in Kurilovskoye Rural Settlement, Sobinsky District, Vladimir Oblast, Russia. The population was 181 as of 2010. There are 4 streets.

== Geography ==
Glukhovo is located on the Vorsha River, 32 km northwest of Sobinka (the district's administrative centre) by road. Morozovo is the nearest rural locality.
