= Mikhail Glukhov =

Russian ice hockey player

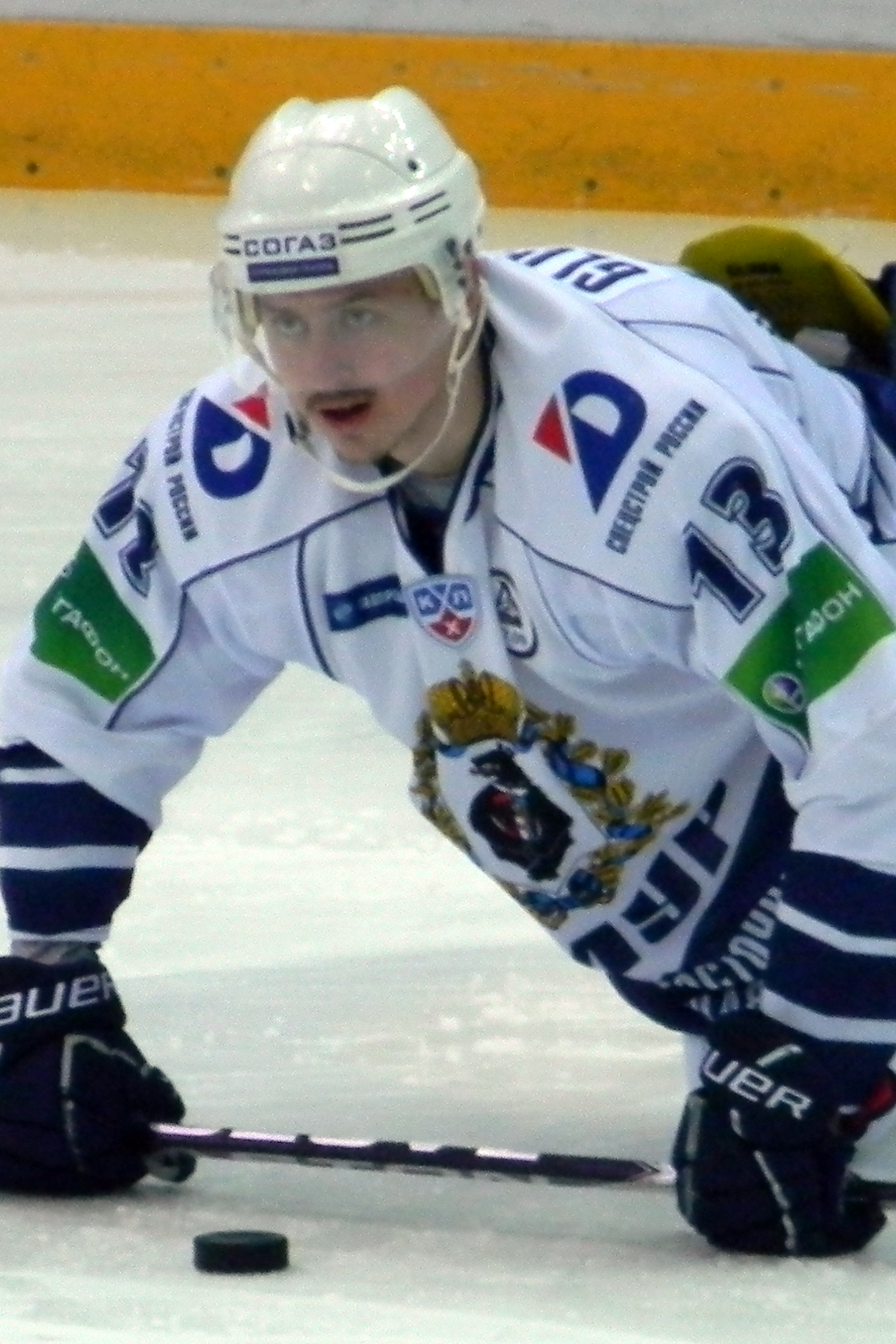
- Born: May 13, 1988 (age 38) Orsk, USSR
- Height: 6 ft 3 in (191 cm)
- Weight: 185 lb (84 kg; 13 st 3 lb)
- Position: Left wing
- Shot: Left
- Played for: Atlant Moscow Oblast; Lada Togliatti; Amur Khabarovsk; Ak Bars Kazan
- Playing career: 2006–2023

Mikhail Sergeyevich Glukhov (Russian: Михаил Сергеевич Глухов; born May 13, 1988) is a Russian former professional ice hockey winger. He most recently played for Ak Bars Kazan of the Kontinental Hockey League (KHL).

Glukhov has previously played with HC Atlant Moscow, HC Lada Togliatti and Amur Khabarovsk.

In his third tenure with Atlant Moscow, Glukhov was traded during the 2014–15 season, to Ak Bars Kazan in exchange for Evgeny Bodrov on November 20, 2014.

He announced his retirement at the end of the 2022-23 season.

== Awards and honours ==
Award	Year
KHL
Gagarin Cup (Ak Bars Kazan)	2018
