= Vichuga =

Town in Ivanovo Oblast, Russia

Vichuga Вичуга
- Town
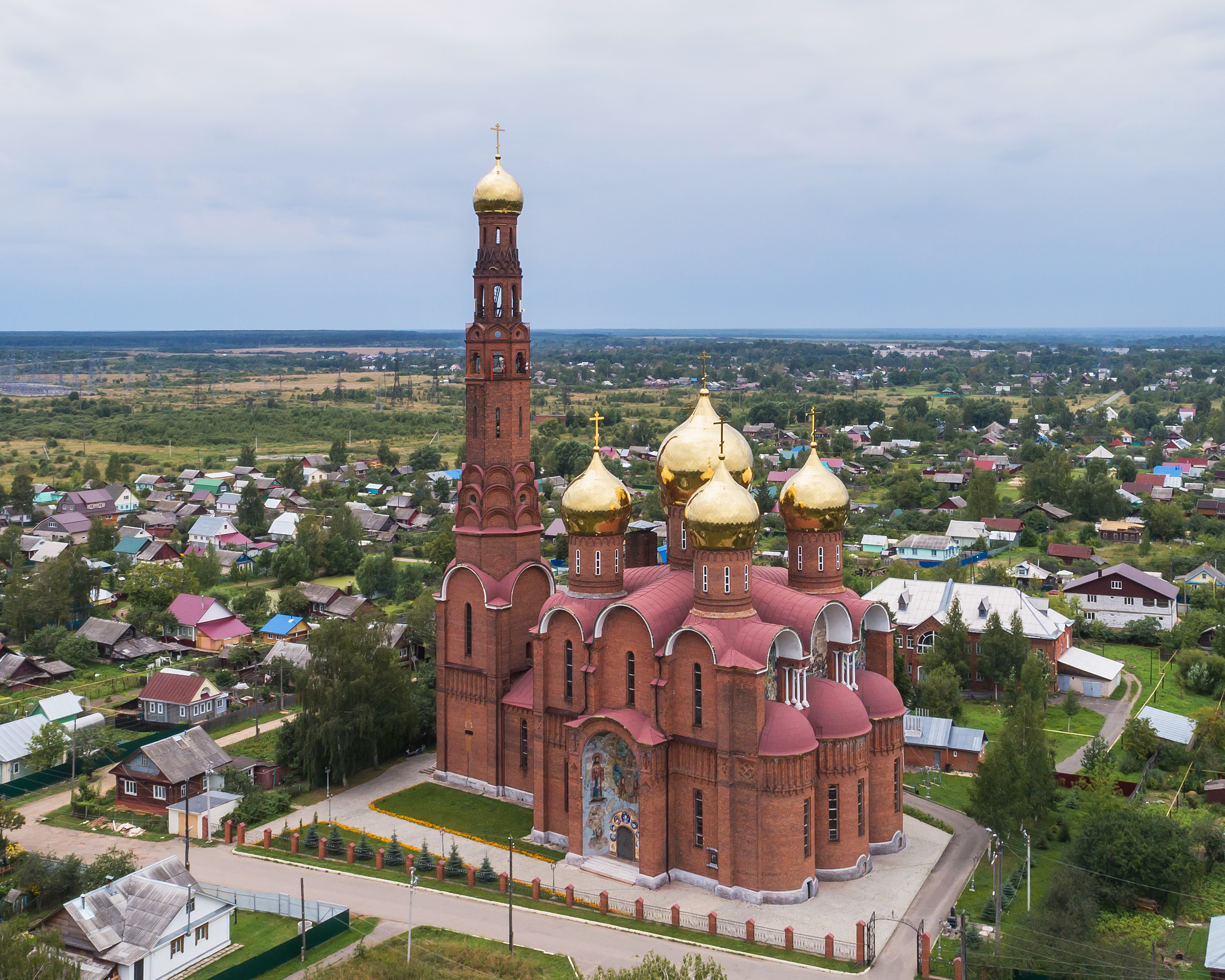
- Red Church in Vichuga

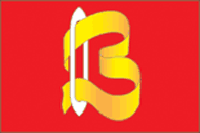
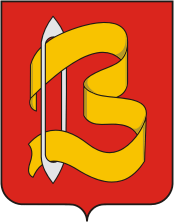
- Flag Coat of arms
- Interactive map of Vichuga
- Location of Vichuga Vichuga (Ivanovo Oblast)
- Coordinates: 57°12′N 41°55′E
- Country: Russia
- Federal subject: Ivanovo Oblast
- First mentioned: 1504
- Elevation: 135 m (443 ft)

Population (2010 Census)
  - Total: 37,583
  - Estimate (2021): 30,694 (−18.3%)

Administrative status
  - Subordinated to: Town of Vichuga
  - Capital of: Vichugsky District, Town of Vichuga

Municipal status
  - Urban okrug: Vichuga Urban Okrug
  - Capital of: Vichuga Urban Okrug, Vichugsky Municipal District
- Time zone: UTC+3 (MSK)
- Postal codes: 155330–155334, 155339
- Dialing code: +7 49354
- OKTMO ID: 24703000001
- Website: www.vichuga37.ru

Vichuga (Russian: Ви́чуга) is a town in Ivanovo Oblast, Russia, located 65 kilometers (40 mi) northeast of Ivanovo. Population: 30,694 (2021 census); 37,583 (2010 census); 40,870 (2002 census); 49,745 (1989 Soviet census); 53,000 (1970).

== History ==
Vichuga was first mentioned as a volost in the will of Ivan III in 1504. Marshal of the Soviet Union Aleksandr Mikhaylovich Vasilevsky was born in Novaya Golchikha, now part of Vichuga, on 30 September 1895.

In 1932 a protest/uprising occurred among the workers of Vichuga. It was sparked by poor condition and a pay decrease. In the end the party conceded to the workers demands

== Administrative and municipal status ==
Within the framework of administrative divisions, Vichuga serves as the administrative center of Vichugsky District, even though it is not a part of it. As an administrative division, it is incorporated separately as the Town of Vichuga—an administrative unit with the status equal to that of the districts. As a municipal division, the Town of Vichuga is incorporated as Vichuga Urban Okrug.
