= Vichugsky District =

Vichugsky District Вичугский район (Russian)
- District
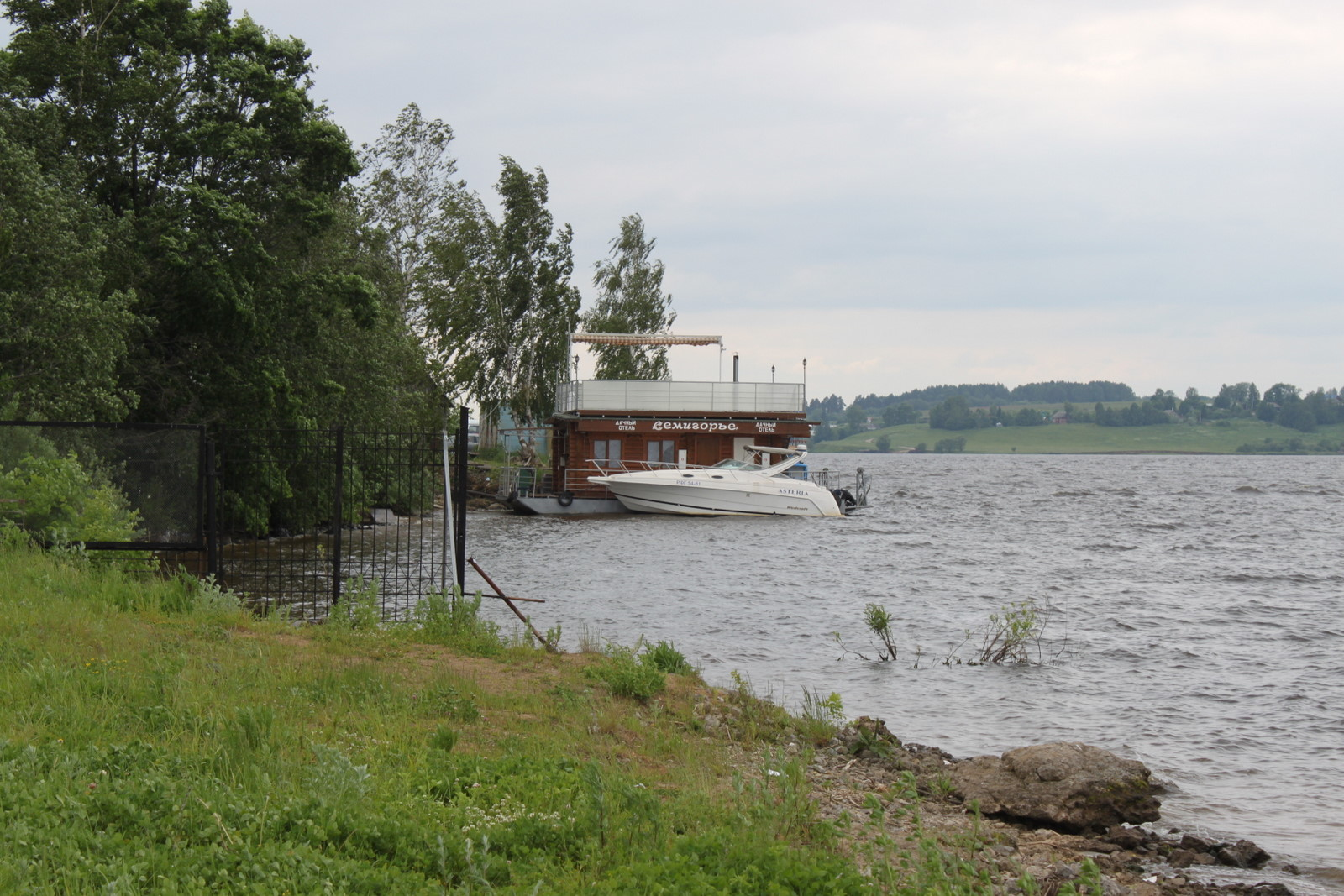
- A pier in the village of Semigorye in Vichugsky District

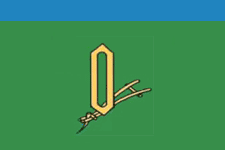
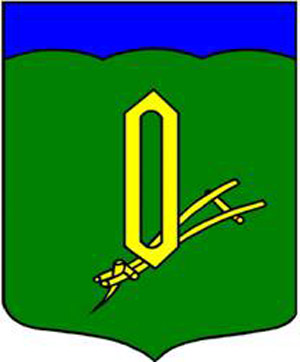
- Flag Coat of arms
- Location of Vichugsky District in Ivanovo Oblast
- Coordinates: 57°12′N 41°55′E
- Country: Russia
- Federal subject: Ivanovo Oblast
- Administrative center: Vichuga

Area
  - Total: 1,005 km^{2} (388 sq mi)

Population (2010 Census)
  - Total: 20,201
  - Density: 20.10/km^{2} (52.06/sq mi)
  - Urban: 59.7%
  - Rural: 40.3%

Administrative structure
  - Inhabited localities: 168 rural localities

Municipal structure
  - Municipally incorporated as: Vichugsky Municipal District
  - Municipal divisions: 3 urban settlements, 3 rural settlements
- Time zone: UTC+3 (MSK)
- OKTMO ID: 24601000
- Website: http://www.vichuga-mr.ru

Population of Vichugsky District
- 2021 Census: 16415
- 2010 Census: 20,201
- 2002 Census: 23,676
- 1989 Census: 27,026
- 1979 Census: 30,405

Vichugsky District (Russian: Ви́чугский райо́н) is an administrative and municipal district (raion), one of the twenty-one in Ivanovo Oblast, Russia. It is located in the northern central part of the oblast. The area of the district is 1,005 square kilometers (388 sq mi). Its administrative center is the town of Vichuga (which is not administratively a part of the district). As of the 2021 Census, the total population of the district was 16,415.

== Administrative and municipal status ==
Within the framework of administrative divisions, Vichugsky District is one of the twenty-one in the oblast. The town of Vichuga serves as its administrative center, despite being incorporated separately as an administrative unit with the status equal to that of the districts.

As a municipal division, the district is incorporated as Vichugsky Municipal District. The Town of Vichuga is incorporated separately from the district as Vichuga Urban Okrug.
