= List of comets discovered by Gennadiy Borisov =

Comet Borisov usually refers to 2I/Borisov, the first interstellar comet ever discovered.

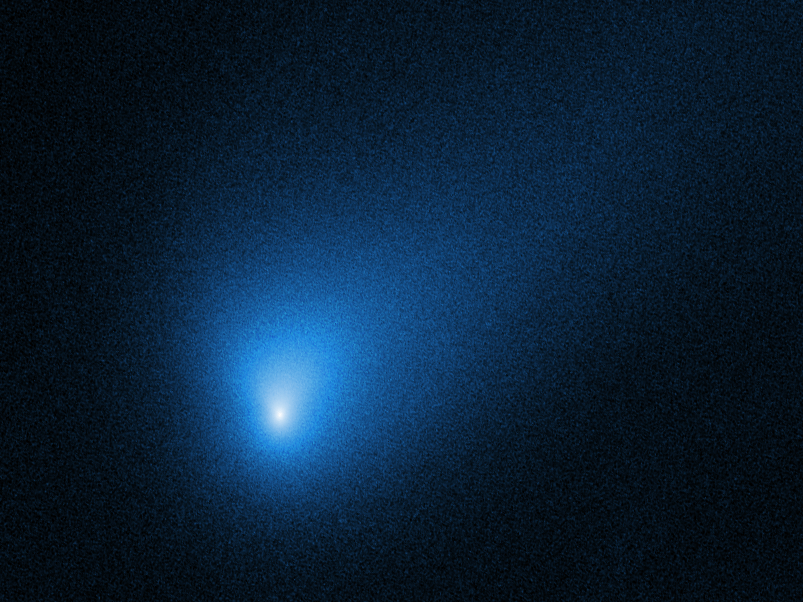
2I/Borisov

It may also refer to any comets below discovered by Crimean astronomer, Gennadiy Borisov:

== Periodic comets ==
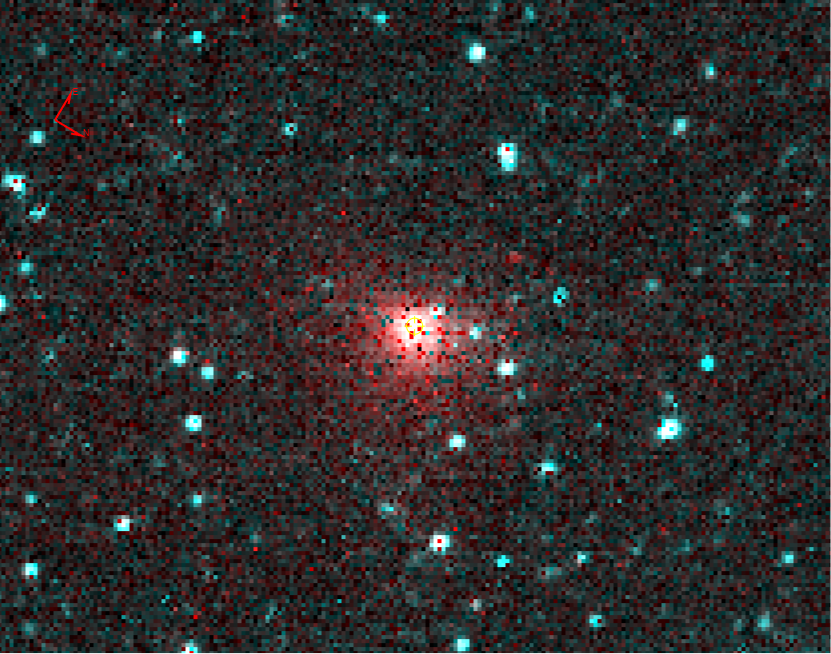
C/2014 Q3

- C/2014 Q3 (Borisov)

== Non-periodic comets ==
- C/2013 N4 (Borisov)
- C/2014 R1 (Borisov)
- C/2015 D4 (Borisov)
- C/2016 R3 (Borisov)
- C/2019 V1 (Borisov)
- C/2020 Q1 (Borisov)
- C/2023 T2 (Borisov)
- C/2024 V1 (Borisov)

== Hyperbolic comets ==
- C/2013 V2 (Borisov), an Oort cloud comet with a weakly hyperbolic eccentricity of 1.004 while located in the planetary region of the Solar System
- C/2017 E1 (Borisov)
- C/2021 L3 (Borisov)
- C/2025 B2 (Borisov)
- C/2025 J1 (Borisov)
- C/2025 V1 (Borisov), an Oort cloud comet with a weakly hyperbolic eccentricity of 1.0082±0.0015
