= List of minor planets: 582001–583000 =

The following is a partial list of minor planets, running from minor-planet number 582001 through 583000, inclusive. The primary data for this and other partial lists is based on JPL's "Small-Body Orbital Elements" and data available from the Minor Planet Center. Critical list information is also provided by the MPC, unless otherwise specified from Lowell Observatory. A detailed description of the table's columns and additional sources are given on the main page including a complete list of every page in this series, and a statistical break-up on the dynamical classification of minor planets.

Also see the summary list of all named bodies in numerical and alphabetical order, and the corresponding naming citations for the number range of this particular list. New namings may only be added to this list after official publication, as the preannouncement of names is condemned by the Working Group for Small Bodies Nomenclature of the International Astronomical Union.

Near-Earth obj.	MBA (inner)	MBA (outer)	Centaur
Mars-crosser	MBA (middle)	Jupiter trojan	Trans-Neptunian obj.
Unclassified

== 582001–582100 ==
Designation			Discovery			Properties		Ref
Permanent	Provisional	Named after	Date	Site	Discoverer(s)	Category	Diam.	Ref
582001	2015 MJ_{131}	—	March 31, 2012	Mount Lemmon	Mount Lemmon Survey	H	440 m	MPC · JPL
582002	2015 MR_{135}	—	October 26, 2011	Haleakala	Pan-STARRS 1	·	1.5 km	MPC · JPL
582003	2015 MA_{136}	—	May 23, 2014	Haleakala	Pan-STARRS 1	·	3.3 km	MPC · JPL
582004	2015 MO_{138}	—	March 23, 2003	Kitt Peak	Spacewatch	·	2.3 km	MPC · JPL
582005	2015 MS_{139}	—	June 17, 2015	Haleakala	Pan-STARRS 1	·	2.3 km	MPC · JPL
582006	2015 MQ_{140}	—	February 22, 2014	Mount Lemmon	Mount Lemmon Survey	THB	2.2 km	MPC · JPL
582007	2015 MC_{141}	—	February 13, 2002	Apache Point	SDSS Collaboration	·	2.7 km	MPC · JPL
582008	2015 MY_{141}	—	June 12, 2005	Kitt Peak	Spacewatch	·	1.8 km	MPC · JPL
582009	2015 MG_{142}	—	April 1, 2003	Apache Point	SDSS Collaboration	LIX	3.3 km	MPC · JPL
582010	2015 MK_{142}	—	April 10, 2010	Mount Lemmon	Mount Lemmon Survey	·	1.5 km	MPC · JPL
582011	2015 MO_{142}	—	February 9, 2013	Haleakala	Pan-STARRS 1	·	2.5 km	MPC · JPL
582012	2015 MR_{145}	—	March 21, 2002	Kitt Peak	Spacewatch	THM	2.2 km	MPC · JPL
582013	2015 MG_{149}	—	June 28, 2015	Haleakala	Pan-STARRS 1	EOS	1.8 km	MPC · JPL
582014	2015 MD_{156}	—	June 22, 2015	Mount Lemmon	Mount Lemmon Survey	·	1.2 km	MPC · JPL
582015	2015 MX_{160}	—	February 6, 2014	Oukaïmeden	C. Rinner	T_{j} (2.98) · EUP	2.6 km	MPC · JPL
582016	2015 MF_{163}	—	June 26, 2015	Haleakala	Pan-STARRS 1	·	3.1 km	MPC · JPL
582017	2015 MQ_{164}	—	June 18, 2015	Haleakala	Pan-STARRS 1	(31811)	2.9 km	MPC · JPL
582018	2015 MG_{165}	—	June 22, 2015	Haleakala	Pan-STARRS 1	·	2.4 km	MPC · JPL
582019	2015 MK_{165}	—	June 18, 2015	Haleakala	Pan-STARRS 1	·	2.5 km	MPC · JPL
582020	2015 ML_{167}	—	June 27, 2015	Haleakala	Pan-STARRS 1	·	1.5 km	MPC · JPL
582021	2015 MX_{174}	—	June 17, 2015	Haleakala	Pan-STARRS 1	·	2.2 km	MPC · JPL
582022	2015 NM	—	April 15, 2010	Kitt Peak	Spacewatch	·	1.9 km	MPC · JPL
582023	2015 NA_{1}	—	April 20, 2015	Haleakala	Pan-STARRS 1	·	2.4 km	MPC · JPL
582024	2015 NE_{1}	—	June 13, 2015	Haleakala	Pan-STARRS 1	·	1.8 km	MPC · JPL
582025	2015 NF_{1}	—	May 14, 2015	Haleakala	Pan-STARRS 1	(1118)	2.6 km	MPC · JPL
582026	2015 NG_{1}	—	June 23, 2015	Haleakala	Pan-STARRS 1	·	2.2 km	MPC · JPL
582027	2015 NC_{2}	—	September 3, 2010	Mount Lemmon	Mount Lemmon Survey	·	2.3 km	MPC · JPL
582028	2015 NN_{2}	—	May 26, 2006	Mount Lemmon	Mount Lemmon Survey	·	1.7 km	MPC · JPL
582029	2015 NS_{3}	—	September 27, 2011	Mount Lemmon	Mount Lemmon Survey	·	2.1 km	MPC · JPL
582030	2015 NG_{6}	—	February 9, 2008	Mount Lemmon	Mount Lemmon Survey	·	2.3 km	MPC · JPL
582031	2015 NS_{6}	—	June 16, 2015	Haleakala	Pan-STARRS 1	·	1.3 km	MPC · JPL
582032	2015 NJ_{7}	—	June 23, 2015	Haleakala	Pan-STARRS 1	·	1.7 km	MPC · JPL
582033	2015 NL_{8}	—	May 23, 2014	Haleakala	Pan-STARRS 1	·	2.8 km	MPC · JPL
582034	2015 NT_{11}	—	June 11, 2015	Haleakala	Pan-STARRS 1	EOS	1.6 km	MPC · JPL
582035	2015 NM_{12}	—	May 25, 2015	Haleakala	Pan-STARRS 1	·	2.2 km	MPC · JPL
582036	2015 NO_{13}	—	July 7, 2003	Kitt Peak	Spacewatch	·	880 m	MPC · JPL
582037	2015 NO_{14}	—	July 9, 2015	Haleakala	Pan-STARRS 1	·	1.7 km	MPC · JPL
582038	2015 NR_{14}	—	September 25, 2011	Haleakala	Pan-STARRS 1	·	1.8 km	MPC · JPL
582039	2015 NU_{14}	—	November 5, 2012	Haleakala	Pan-STARRS 1	WIT	960 m	MPC · JPL
582040	2015 NH_{15}	—	June 25, 2015	Haleakala	Pan-STARRS 1	·	1.5 km	MPC · JPL
582041	2015 NN_{15}	—	January 18, 2012	Mount Lemmon	Mount Lemmon Survey	·	2.8 km	MPC · JPL
582042	2015 NW_{19}	—	July 13, 2015	Haleakala	Pan-STARRS 1	H	510 m	MPC · JPL
582043	2015 NE_{20}	—	December 31, 2007	Kitt Peak	Spacewatch	EOS	1.9 km	MPC · JPL
582044	2015 NF_{20}	—	July 13, 2015	Haleakala	Pan-STARRS 1	·	2.4 km	MPC · JPL
582045	2015 NH_{21}	—	May 21, 2015	Haleakala	Pan-STARRS 1	·	920 m	MPC · JPL
582046	2015 NR_{21}	—	February 21, 2009	Kitt Peak	Spacewatch	·	2.4 km	MPC · JPL
582047	2015 NY_{21}	—	July 13, 2015	Haleakala	Pan-STARRS 1	·	1.2 km	MPC · JPL
582048	2015 NZ_{21}	—	January 12, 2008	Kitt Peak	Spacewatch	·	3.0 km	MPC · JPL
582049	2015 NV_{22}	—	September 24, 2000	Socorro	LINEAR	·	2.1 km	MPC · JPL
582050	2015 NX_{22}	—	August 8, 2012	Haleakala	Pan-STARRS 1	·	370 m	MPC · JPL
582051	2015 NU_{26}	—	May 4, 2014	Haleakala	Pan-STARRS 1	·	2.8 km	MPC · JPL
582052	2015 NA_{27}	—	March 5, 2013	Haleakala	Pan-STARRS 1	EOS	2.0 km	MPC · JPL
582053	2015 NH_{27}	—	February 10, 2008	Kitt Peak	Spacewatch	·	2.4 km	MPC · JPL
582054	2015 NC_{30}	—	July 14, 2015	Haleakala	Pan-STARRS 1	·	820 m	MPC · JPL
582055	2015 OE_{1}	—	June 13, 2015	Haleakala	Pan-STARRS 1	·	1.7 km	MPC · JPL
582056	2015 OP_{2}	—	June 12, 2015	Haleakala	Pan-STARRS 1	·	3.8 km	MPC · JPL
582057	2015 OV_{2}	—	October 4, 2004	Kitt Peak	Spacewatch	·	3.1 km	MPC · JPL
582058	2015 OZ_{2}	—	February 7, 2002	Kitt Peak	Spacewatch	·	3.6 km	MPC · JPL
582059	2015 OE_{3}	—	September 14, 2007	Catalina	CSS	EUN	1.3 km	MPC · JPL
582060	2015 OL_{3}	—	March 31, 2008	Mount Lemmon	Mount Lemmon Survey	·	2.8 km	MPC · JPL
582061	2015 OO_{3}	—	August 27, 2011	Haleakala	Pan-STARRS 1	·	1.5 km	MPC · JPL
582062	2015 OK_{4}	—	March 1, 2008	Kitt Peak	Spacewatch	·	2.8 km	MPC · JPL
582063	2015 OC_{6}	—	October 6, 2005	Mount Lemmon	Mount Lemmon Survey	EOS	1.6 km	MPC · JPL
582064	2015 OL_{7}	—	April 1, 2014	Mount Lemmon	Mount Lemmon Survey	·	2.2 km	MPC · JPL
582065	2015 OB_{8}	—	February 17, 2013	Mount Lemmon	Mount Lemmon Survey	·	2.7 km	MPC · JPL
582066	2015 OZ_{8}	—	September 18, 2010	Mount Lemmon	Mount Lemmon Survey	·	2.5 km	MPC · JPL
582067	2015 OG_{10}	—	February 13, 2013	Haleakala	Pan-STARRS 1	(1118)	2.8 km	MPC · JPL
582068	2015 OJ_{11}	—	July 11, 2015	Haleakala	Pan-STARRS 1	·	1.2 km	MPC · JPL
582069	2015 OW_{11}	—	December 31, 2007	Mount Lemmon	Mount Lemmon Survey	·	2.8 km	MPC · JPL
582070	2015 OE_{14}	—	April 7, 2008	Mount Lemmon	Mount Lemmon Survey	EOS	1.9 km	MPC · JPL
582071	2015 OK_{20}	—	July 18, 2015	Haleakala	Pan-STARRS 1	·	2.3 km	MPC · JPL
582072	2015 OD_{23}	—	May 23, 2014	Haleakala	Pan-STARRS 1	·	3.2 km	MPC · JPL
582073	2015 OF_{23}	—	May 23, 2014	Haleakala	Pan-STARRS 1	·	3.5 km	MPC · JPL
582074	2015 OB_{25}	—	March 9, 2005	Mount Lemmon	Mount Lemmon Survey	·	850 m	MPC · JPL
582075	2015 OD_{27}	—	March 13, 2010	Mount Lemmon	Mount Lemmon Survey	MAS	860 m	MPC · JPL
582076	2015 OQ_{29}	—	December 17, 2012	ESA OGS	ESA OGS	·	600 m	MPC · JPL
582077	2015 OO_{31}	—	July 13, 2001	Palomar	NEAT	·	2.0 km	MPC · JPL
582078	2015 OX_{31}	—	January 2, 2012	Mount Lemmon	Mount Lemmon Survey	·	3.8 km	MPC · JPL
582079	2015 OB_{37}	—	February 10, 2008	Kitt Peak	Spacewatch	·	2.9 km	MPC · JPL
582080	2015 OL_{42}	—	July 24, 2015	Haleakala	Pan-STARRS 1	·	1.9 km	MPC · JPL
582081	2015 OT_{42}	—	March 5, 2008	Kitt Peak	Spacewatch	·	4.0 km	MPC · JPL
582082	2015 OQ_{43}	—	January 23, 2006	Kitt Peak	Spacewatch	·	1.1 km	MPC · JPL
582083	2015 OO_{44}	—	January 6, 2013	Kitt Peak	Spacewatch	·	3.5 km	MPC · JPL
582084	2015 OP_{44}	—	September 2, 2010	Mount Lemmon	Mount Lemmon Survey	·	2.0 km	MPC · JPL
582085	2015 OX_{50}	—	September 17, 2010	Mount Lemmon	Mount Lemmon Survey	·	3.2 km	MPC · JPL
582086	2015 OG_{51}	—	September 30, 2010	Mount Lemmon	Mount Lemmon Survey	·	2.9 km	MPC · JPL
582087	2015 OC_{52}	—	March 29, 2008	Kitt Peak	Spacewatch	·	3.0 km	MPC · JPL
582088	2015 OK_{52}	—	May 7, 2014	Haleakala	Pan-STARRS 1	·	2.6 km	MPC · JPL
582089	2015 OS_{58}	—	July 2, 2014	Haleakala	Pan-STARRS 1	·	2.8 km	MPC · JPL
582090	2015 OA_{60}	—	July 26, 2015	Haleakala	Pan-STARRS 1	·	2.5 km	MPC · JPL
582091	2015 OS_{63}	—	May 4, 2014	Mount Lemmon	Mount Lemmon Survey	·	1.5 km	MPC · JPL
582092	2015 OQ_{67}	—	September 11, 2004	Kitt Peak	Spacewatch	·	2.6 km	MPC · JPL
582093	2015 OR_{68}	—	July 27, 2015	Haleakala	Pan-STARRS 1	·	2.8 km	MPC · JPL
582094	2015 OV_{68}	—	May 23, 2014	Haleakala	Pan-STARRS 1	(21885)	2.8 km	MPC · JPL
582095	2015 OB_{69}	—	April 29, 2014	Haleakala	Pan-STARRS 1	VER	2.4 km	MPC · JPL
582096	2015 ON_{82}	—	July 23, 2015	Haleakala	Pan-STARRS 1	·	1.9 km	MPC · JPL
582097	2015 OJ_{88}	—	March 26, 2014	Mount Lemmon	Mount Lemmon Survey	·	2.9 km	MPC · JPL
582098	2015 OK_{88}	—	April 24, 2014	Haleakala	Pan-STARRS 1	·	2.4 km	MPC · JPL
582099	2015 ON_{89}	—	November 1, 2010	Mount Lemmon	Mount Lemmon Survey	·	3.4 km	MPC · JPL
582100	2015 OF_{90}	—	May 7, 2014	Haleakala	Pan-STARRS 1	·	1.7 km	MPC · JPL

== 582101–582200 ==
back to top

Designation			Discovery			Properties		Ref
Permanent	Provisional	Named after	Date	Site	Discoverer(s)	Category	Diam.	Ref
582101	2015 OL_{94}	—	July 23, 2015	Haleakala	Pan-STARRS 1	·	2.6 km	MPC · JPL
582102	2015 OE_{97}	—	July 24, 2015	Haleakala	Pan-STARRS 1	·	2.5 km	MPC · JPL
582103	2015 OH_{97}	—	February 5, 2013	Kitt Peak	Spacewatch	·	1.7 km	MPC · JPL
582104	2015 OT_{97}	—	July 24, 2015	Haleakala	Pan-STARRS 1	·	1.5 km	MPC · JPL
582105	2015 OP_{102}	—	October 30, 2011	Ka-Dar	Gerke, V.	·	1.5 km	MPC · JPL
582106	2015 OE_{103}	—	August 12, 2010	Kitt Peak	Spacewatch	·	1.6 km	MPC · JPL
582107	2015 OB_{104}	—	February 13, 2002	Apache Point	SDSS Collaboration	·	2.3 km	MPC · JPL
582108	2015 OR_{112}	—	November 24, 2016	Mount Lemmon	Mount Lemmon Survey	·	2.0 km	MPC · JPL
582109	2015 OW_{113}	—	April 9, 2014	Mount Lemmon	Mount Lemmon Survey	·	1.5 km	MPC · JPL
582110	2015 OT_{114}	—	July 19, 2015	Haleakala	Pan-STARRS 1	·	1.8 km	MPC · JPL
582111	2015 OC_{123}	—	July 24, 2015	Haleakala	Pan-STARRS 1	·	3.4 km	MPC · JPL
582112	2015 OF_{124}	—	July 28, 2015	Haleakala	Pan-STARRS 1	AEO	840 m	MPC · JPL
582113	2015 OQ_{124}	—	July 25, 2015	Haleakala	Pan-STARRS 1	EUP	2.3 km	MPC · JPL
582114	2015 OV_{124}	—	July 25, 2015	Haleakala	Pan-STARRS 1	·	1.9 km	MPC · JPL
582115	2015 OW_{127}	—	July 25, 2015	Haleakala	Pan-STARRS 1	·	2.2 km	MPC · JPL
582116	2015 OC_{129}	—	July 24, 2015	Haleakala	Pan-STARRS 1	·	2.4 km	MPC · JPL
582117	2015 OE_{129}	—	July 23, 2015	Haleakala	Pan-STARRS 1	·	1.8 km	MPC · JPL
582118	2015 OT_{144}	—	July 24, 2015	Haleakala	Pan-STARRS 1	·	750 m	MPC · JPL
582119	2015 PC_{5}	—	August 5, 2015	Haleakala	Pan-STARRS 1	·	1.5 km	MPC · JPL
582120	2015 PR_{6}	—	August 27, 2003	Palomar	NEAT	·	1.6 km	MPC · JPL
582121	2015 PW_{6}	—	August 22, 1995	Kitt Peak	Spacewatch	·	2.6 km	MPC · JPL
582122	2015 PD_{8}	—	November 24, 2011	Haleakala	Pan-STARRS 1	·	3.9 km	MPC · JPL
582123	2015 PH_{11}	—	May 6, 2014	Haleakala	Pan-STARRS 1	EOS	1.9 km	MPC · JPL
582124	2015 PE_{14}	—	September 5, 2010	Mount Lemmon	Mount Lemmon Survey	·	2.5 km	MPC · JPL
582125	2015 PT_{18}	—	October 12, 2009	Mount Lemmon	Mount Lemmon Survey	·	490 m	MPC · JPL
582126	2015 PV_{21}	—	January 3, 2012	Mount Lemmon	Mount Lemmon Survey	·	2.9 km	MPC · JPL
582127	2015 PG_{22}	—	January 19, 2013	Mount Lemmon	Mount Lemmon Survey	·	2.5 km	MPC · JPL
582128	2015 PJ_{23}	—	November 11, 2010	Kitt Peak	Spacewatch	·	3.3 km	MPC · JPL
582129	2015 PZ_{23}	—	July 16, 2010	WISE	WISE	·	2.8 km	MPC · JPL
582130	2015 PA_{24}	—	March 10, 2008	Kitt Peak	Spacewatch	VER	2.6 km	MPC · JPL
582131	2015 PM_{25}	—	October 1, 2005	Mount Lemmon	Mount Lemmon Survey	·	4.1 km	MPC · JPL
582132	2015 PN_{25}	—	February 24, 2008	Mount Lemmon	Mount Lemmon Survey	·	3.0 km	MPC · JPL
582133	2015 PR_{27}	—	April 20, 2014	Mount Lemmon	Mount Lemmon Survey	LUT	3.8 km	MPC · JPL
582134	2015 PS_{27}	—	February 17, 2013	Mount Lemmon	Mount Lemmon Survey	·	2.8 km	MPC · JPL
582135	2015 PT_{28}	—	July 18, 2015	Haleakala	Pan-STARRS 1	T_{j} (2.98) · EUP	2.3 km	MPC · JPL
582136	2015 PJ_{30}	—	March 31, 2008	Kitt Peak	Spacewatch	·	2.8 km	MPC · JPL
582137	2015 PF_{34}	—	August 8, 2015	Haleakala	Pan-STARRS 1	·	3.0 km	MPC · JPL
582138	2015 PZ_{35}	—	May 7, 2014	Haleakala	Pan-STARRS 1	·	3.0 km	MPC · JPL
582139	2015 PU_{37}	—	June 25, 2015	Haleakala	Pan-STARRS 1	·	1.6 km	MPC · JPL
582140	2015 PW_{38}	—	March 5, 2008	Mount Lemmon	Mount Lemmon Survey	·	1.6 km	MPC · JPL
582141	2015 PL_{40}	—	September 13, 2007	Mount Lemmon	Mount Lemmon Survey	·	1.1 km	MPC · JPL
582142	2015 PW_{42}	—	February 15, 2013	ESA OGS	ESA OGS	EOS	1.8 km	MPC · JPL
582143	2015 PJ_{44}	—	April 30, 2014	Haleakala	Pan-STARRS 1	·	1.5 km	MPC · JPL
582144	2015 PV_{44}	—	June 25, 2015	Haleakala	Pan-STARRS 1	·	950 m	MPC · JPL
582145	2015 PC_{45}	—	May 7, 2014	Haleakala	Pan-STARRS 1	·	1.7 km	MPC · JPL
582146	2015 PK_{45}	—	November 19, 2003	Kitt Peak	Spacewatch	·	1.6 km	MPC · JPL
582147	2015 PH_{49}	—	May 7, 2014	Haleakala	Pan-STARRS 1	·	1.5 km	MPC · JPL
582148	2015 PB_{51}	—	August 9, 2015	Haleakala	Pan-STARRS 1	·	1.8 km	MPC · JPL
582149	2015 PN_{51}	—	December 23, 2012	Haleakala	Pan-STARRS 1	·	1.4 km	MPC · JPL
582150	2015 PY_{56}	—	June 29, 2015	Haleakala	Pan-STARRS 1	H	410 m	MPC · JPL
582151	2015 PD_{59}	—	January 19, 2012	Catalina	CSS	·	3.0 km	MPC · JPL
582152	2015 PV_{59}	—	March 6, 2008	Mount Lemmon	Mount Lemmon Survey	EOS	1.6 km	MPC · JPL
582153	2015 PM_{60}	—	October 1, 2005	Kitt Peak	Spacewatch	·	1.6 km	MPC · JPL
582154	2015 PA_{68}	—	April 5, 2014	Haleakala	Pan-STARRS 1	·	2.4 km	MPC · JPL
582155	2015 PM_{72}	—	February 13, 2002	Apache Point	SDSS	·	3.0 km	MPC · JPL
582156	2015 PT_{73}	—	September 30, 2010	Mount Lemmon	Mount Lemmon Survey	HYG	2.2 km	MPC · JPL
582157	2015 PT_{75}	—	June 26, 2015	Haleakala	Pan-STARRS 1	·	2.7 km	MPC · JPL
582158	2015 PU_{80}	—	February 26, 2009	Kitt Peak	Spacewatch	·	1.8 km	MPC · JPL
582159	2015 PQ_{81}	—	February 14, 2007	Mauna Kea	P. A. Wiegert	·	2.5 km	MPC · JPL
582160	2015 PU_{83}	—	January 1, 2012	Mount Lemmon	Mount Lemmon Survey	·	2.5 km	MPC · JPL
582161	2015 PT_{87}	—	July 14, 2015	Haleakala	Pan-STARRS 1	·	1.2 km	MPC · JPL
582162	2015 PQ_{90}	—	April 23, 2014	Cerro Tololo-DECam	DECam	KOR	990 m	MPC · JPL
582163	2015 PK_{93}	—	July 18, 2015	Haleakala	Pan-STARRS 1	·	2.2 km	MPC · JPL
582164	2015 PS_{95}	—	September 11, 2010	Mount Lemmon	Mount Lemmon Survey	·	2.9 km	MPC · JPL
582165	2015 PK_{97}	—	April 8, 2014	Mount Lemmon	Mount Lemmon Survey	URS	2.4 km	MPC · JPL
582166	2015 PH_{98}	—	September 18, 2010	Mount Lemmon	Mount Lemmon Survey	·	2.6 km	MPC · JPL
582167	2015 PV_{98}	—	March 10, 2008	Kitt Peak	Spacewatch	·	550 m	MPC · JPL
582168	2015 PX_{98}	—	December 1, 1996	Kitt Peak	Spacewatch	·	640 m	MPC · JPL
582169	2015 PE_{101}	—	April 21, 2014	Mount Lemmon	Mount Lemmon Survey	·	2.4 km	MPC · JPL
582170	2015 PZ_{106}	—	July 27, 2015	Haleakala	Pan-STARRS 1	·	1.8 km	MPC · JPL
582171	2015 PW_{107}	—	May 4, 2014	Mount Lemmon	Mount Lemmon Survey	·	2.4 km	MPC · JPL
582172	2015 PJ_{108}	—	April 22, 2009	Mount Lemmon	Mount Lemmon Survey	·	1.3 km	MPC · JPL
582173	2015 PW_{108}	—	July 19, 2015	Haleakala	Pan-STARRS 1	AGN	970 m	MPC · JPL
582174	2015 PC_{109}	—	March 19, 2013	Haleakala	Pan-STARRS 1	·	3.0 km	MPC · JPL
582175	2015 PF_{117}	—	December 16, 2011	Haleakala	Pan-STARRS 1	·	2.8 km	MPC · JPL
582176	2015 PO_{117}	—	September 1, 2005	Palomar	NEAT	·	1.8 km	MPC · JPL
582177	2015 PN_{125}	—	September 25, 2012	Mount Lemmon	Mount Lemmon Survey	·	500 m	MPC · JPL
582178	2015 PW_{126}	—	January 28, 2011	Kitt Peak	Spacewatch	·	660 m	MPC · JPL
582179	2015 PG_{131}	—	August 10, 2015	Haleakala	Pan-STARRS 1	·	3.0 km	MPC · JPL
582180	2015 PL_{141}	—	May 23, 2014	Haleakala	Pan-STARRS 1	EOS	1.8 km	MPC · JPL
582181	2015 PQ_{147}	—	July 25, 2015	Haleakala	Pan-STARRS 1	·	2.0 km	MPC · JPL
582182	2015 PK_{148}	—	August 10, 2015	Haleakala	Pan-STARRS 1	·	2.5 km	MPC · JPL
582183	2015 PK_{151}	—	August 10, 2015	Haleakala	Pan-STARRS 1	·	2.8 km	MPC · JPL
582184	2015 PD_{152}	—	January 22, 2013	Kitt Peak	Spacewatch	·	1.3 km	MPC · JPL
582185	2015 PB_{154}	—	January 25, 2014	Haleakala	Pan-STARRS 1	·	840 m	MPC · JPL
582186	2015 PS_{157}	—	July 24, 2015	Haleakala	Pan-STARRS 1	·	2.0 km	MPC · JPL
582187	2015 PA_{158}	—	June 25, 2015	Haleakala	Pan-STARRS 1	·	2.8 km	MPC · JPL
582188	2015 PD_{163}	—	December 24, 2006	Kitt Peak	Spacewatch	·	550 m	MPC · JPL
582189	2015 PO_{166}	—	August 10, 2015	Haleakala	Pan-STARRS 1	KOR	1.0 km	MPC · JPL
582190	2015 PN_{169}	—	November 28, 2011	Mount Lemmon	Mount Lemmon Survey	·	3.6 km	MPC · JPL
582191	2015 PB_{173}	—	August 28, 2005	Kitt Peak	Spacewatch	·	1.7 km	MPC · JPL
582192	2015 PT_{174}	—	March 8, 2013	Haleakala	Pan-STARRS 1	·	2.5 km	MPC · JPL
582193	2015 PU_{178}	—	May 6, 2014	Haleakala	Pan-STARRS 1	·	2.4 km	MPC · JPL
582194	2015 PF_{186}	—	July 24, 2015	Haleakala	Pan-STARRS 1	·	3.5 km	MPC · JPL
582195	2015 PY_{186}	—	April 5, 2014	Haleakala	Pan-STARRS 1	·	1.1 km	MPC · JPL
582196	2015 PA_{193}	—	June 23, 2014	Mount Lemmon	Mount Lemmon Survey	·	3.1 km	MPC · JPL
582197	2015 PN_{198}	—	October 14, 2010	Bergisch Gladbach	W. Bickel	·	2.9 km	MPC · JPL
582198	2015 PV_{199}	—	July 2, 2014	Haleakala	Pan-STARRS 1	·	2.9 km	MPC · JPL
582199	2015 PR_{203}	—	July 24, 2015	Haleakala	Pan-STARRS 1	·	2.1 km	MPC · JPL
582200	2015 PG_{208}	—	October 29, 2005	Mount Lemmon	Mount Lemmon Survey	·	3.0 km	MPC · JPL

== 582201–582300 ==
back to top

Designation			Discovery			Properties		Ref
Permanent	Provisional	Named after	Date	Site	Discoverer(s)	Category	Diam.	Ref
582201	2015 PN_{218}	—	February 9, 2013	Haleakala	Pan-STARRS 1	·	3.7 km	MPC · JPL
582202	2015 PT_{219}	—	August 10, 2015	Haleakala	Pan-STARRS 1	·	1.9 km	MPC · JPL
582203	2015 PJ_{221}	—	November 18, 2011	Mount Lemmon	Mount Lemmon Survey	·	2.5 km	MPC · JPL
582204	2015 PF_{222}	—	July 17, 2010	WISE	WISE	·	2.5 km	MPC · JPL
582205	2015 PA_{234}	—	February 13, 2008	Kitt Peak	Spacewatch	·	3.0 km	MPC · JPL
582206	2015 PF_{236}	—	May 11, 2010	Mount Lemmon	Mount Lemmon Survey	·	1.0 km	MPC · JPL
582207	2015 PU_{237}	—	January 10, 2007	Kitt Peak	Spacewatch	·	2.8 km	MPC · JPL
582208	2015 PF_{247}	—	December 18, 2007	Mount Lemmon	Mount Lemmon Survey	·	1.8 km	MPC · JPL
582209	2015 PH_{249}	—	April 5, 2014	Haleakala	Pan-STARRS 1	·	1.6 km	MPC · JPL
582210	2015 PY_{256}	—	June 27, 2004	Kitt Peak	Spacewatch	·	2.1 km	MPC · JPL
582211	2015 PY_{257}	—	January 27, 2007	Mount Lemmon	Mount Lemmon Survey	·	3.2 km	MPC · JPL
582212	2015 PG_{261}	—	February 6, 2013	Kitt Peak	Spacewatch	EOS	2.0 km	MPC · JPL
582213	2015 PH_{267}	—	August 11, 2015	Haleakala	Pan-STARRS 1	·	2.5 km	MPC · JPL
582214	2015 PQ_{270}	—	January 26, 2012	Mount Lemmon	Mount Lemmon Survey	·	3.1 km	MPC · JPL
582215	2015 PV_{299}	—	January 22, 2013	Mount Lemmon	Mount Lemmon Survey	·	1.6 km	MPC · JPL
582216	2015 PU_{300}	—	July 21, 2010	WISE	WISE	·	2.1 km	MPC · JPL
582217	2015 PS_{302}	—	June 14, 2010	Mount Lemmon	Mount Lemmon Survey	·	1.7 km	MPC · JPL
582218	2015 PW_{304}	—	April 28, 2014	Kitt Peak	Spacewatch	·	1.8 km	MPC · JPL
582219	2015 PZ_{305}	—	September 23, 2009	Mount Lemmon	Mount Lemmon Survey	·	3.5 km	MPC · JPL
582220	2015 PH_{307}	—	June 29, 2015	Haleakala	Pan-STARRS 1	·	1.8 km	MPC · JPL
582221	2015 PY_{322}	—	October 17, 2010	Mount Lemmon	Mount Lemmon Survey	·	2.2 km	MPC · JPL
582222	2015 PN_{332}	—	August 9, 2015	Haleakala	Pan-STARRS 1	·	1.3 km	MPC · JPL
582223	2015 PV_{332}	—	August 12, 2015	Haleakala	Pan-STARRS 1	·	1.5 km	MPC · JPL
582224	2015 QO_{1}	—	January 8, 2013	Kitt Peak	Spacewatch	·	2.9 km	MPC · JPL
582225	2015 QR_{1}	—	November 4, 2005	Anderson Mesa	LONEOS	·	4.0 km	MPC · JPL
582226	2015 QM_{14}	—	September 20, 2009	Mount Lemmon	Mount Lemmon Survey	·	2.4 km	MPC · JPL
582227	2015 QM_{18}	—	January 19, 2012	Kitt Peak	Spacewatch	·	2.8 km	MPC · JPL
582228	2015 QV_{20}	—	July 9, 2002	Palomar	NEAT	·	1.5 km	MPC · JPL
582229	2015 QK_{21}	—	August 21, 2015	Haleakala	Pan-STARRS 1	HYG	2.2 km	MPC · JPL
582230	2015 QZ_{23}	—	August 21, 2015	Haleakala	Pan-STARRS 1	·	2.7 km	MPC · JPL
582231	2015 QL_{25}	—	July 2, 2014	Haleakala	Pan-STARRS 1	·	2.6 km	MPC · JPL
582232	2015 QD_{26}	—	August 21, 2015	Haleakala	Pan-STARRS 1	·	2.2 km	MPC · JPL
582233	2015 QM_{28}	—	August 30, 2015	Haleakala	Pan-STARRS 1	·	1.9 km	MPC · JPL
582234	2015 RT_{5}	—	May 23, 2014	Haleakala	Pan-STARRS 1	·	3.0 km	MPC · JPL
582235	2015 RK_{7}	—	December 8, 2012	Mount Lemmon	Mount Lemmon Survey	·	2.1 km	MPC · JPL
582236	2015 RH_{9}	—	July 21, 2006	Mount Lemmon	Mount Lemmon Survey	·	1.8 km	MPC · JPL
582237	2015 RO_{12}	—	March 12, 2007	Mount Lemmon	Mount Lemmon Survey	·	3.3 km	MPC · JPL
582238	2015 RY_{18}	—	December 4, 2012	Mount Lemmon	Mount Lemmon Survey	·	550 m	MPC · JPL
582239	2015 RH_{21}	—	March 15, 2013	Mount Lemmon	Mount Lemmon Survey	·	3.6 km	MPC · JPL
582240	2015 RP_{31}	—	July 23, 2015	Haleakala	Pan-STARRS 1	NYS	800 m	MPC · JPL
582241	2015 RZ_{32}	—	September 9, 2015	Haleakala	Pan-STARRS 1	·	2.1 km	MPC · JPL
582242	2015 RT_{34}	—	December 25, 2010	Mount Lemmon	Mount Lemmon Survey	·	2.9 km	MPC · JPL
582243	2015 RR_{39}	—	July 23, 2015	Haleakala	Pan-STARRS 1	·	2.4 km	MPC · JPL
582244	2015 RM_{42}	—	October 17, 2010	Mount Lemmon	Mount Lemmon Survey	·	2.5 km	MPC · JPL
582245	2015 RT_{42}	—	September 10, 2015	Haleakala	Pan-STARRS 1	·	2.1 km	MPC · JPL
582246	2015 RH_{43}	—	September 12, 2009	Kitt Peak	Spacewatch	·	3.3 km	MPC · JPL
582247	2015 RN_{45}	—	February 13, 2012	Haleakala	Pan-STARRS 1	·	2.7 km	MPC · JPL
582248	2015 RB_{50}	—	April 30, 2014	Haleakala	Pan-STARRS 1	·	490 m	MPC · JPL
582249	2015 RQ_{59}	—	April 10, 2013	Haleakala	Pan-STARRS 1	VER	2.4 km	MPC · JPL
582250	2015 RW_{61}	—	May 2, 2008	Catalina	CSS	·	2.8 km	MPC · JPL
582251	2015 RN_{67}	—	March 18, 2001	Kitt Peak	Spacewatch	EOS	1.8 km	MPC · JPL
582252	2015 RS_{73}	—	September 10, 2015	Haleakala	Pan-STARRS 1	·	2.5 km	MPC · JPL
582253	2015 RQ_{81}	—	October 6, 2008	Mount Lemmon	Mount Lemmon Survey	·	1.1 km	MPC · JPL
582254	2015 RS_{87}	—	December 10, 2005	Kitt Peak	Spacewatch	VER	3.8 km	MPC · JPL
582255	2015 RC_{93}	—	September 2, 2010	Mount Lemmon	Mount Lemmon Survey	EOS	1.7 km	MPC · JPL
582256	2015 RZ_{99}	—	October 16, 2012	Mount Lemmon	Mount Lemmon Survey	·	720 m	MPC · JPL
582257	2015 RO_{100}	—	October 31, 2010	Kitt Peak	Spacewatch	·	4.3 km	MPC · JPL
582258	2015 RW_{108}	—	August 25, 2005	Palomar	NEAT	·	660 m	MPC · JPL
582259	2015 RZ_{110}	—	September 9, 2015	Haleakala	Pan-STARRS 1	NYS	680 m	MPC · JPL
582260	2015 RO_{120}	—	January 8, 2010	Kitt Peak	Spacewatch	(2076)	740 m	MPC · JPL
582261	2015 RL_{122}	—	October 1, 2005	Anderson Mesa	LONEOS	·	750 m	MPC · JPL
582262	2015 RJ_{129}	—	March 1, 2009	Kitt Peak	Spacewatch	·	1.3 km	MPC · JPL
582263	2015 RA_{135}	—	March 29, 2008	Mount Lemmon	Mount Lemmon Survey	KOR	1.1 km	MPC · JPL
582264	2015 RO_{136}	—	March 20, 2002	Kitt Peak	Spacewatch	EOS	1.7 km	MPC · JPL
582265	2015 RZ_{137}	—	September 29, 2010	Mount Lemmon	Mount Lemmon Survey	·	1.5 km	MPC · JPL
582266	2015 RA_{139}	—	February 26, 2014	Haleakala	Pan-STARRS 1	·	500 m	MPC · JPL
582267	2015 RP_{144}	—	May 28, 2014	Haleakala	Pan-STARRS 1	·	1.6 km	MPC · JPL
582268	2015 RC_{176}	—	February 23, 2007	Mount Lemmon	Mount Lemmon Survey	·	2.4 km	MPC · JPL
582269	2015 RB_{179}	—	September 17, 2010	Mount Lemmon	Mount Lemmon Survey	·	1.2 km	MPC · JPL
582270	2015 RZ_{184}	—	March 14, 2013	Kitt Peak	Spacewatch	·	2.0 km	MPC · JPL
582271	2015 RA_{203}	—	January 26, 2007	Kitt Peak	Spacewatch	·	550 m	MPC · JPL
582272	2015 RL_{203}	—	October 25, 2005	Kitt Peak	Spacewatch	·	670 m	MPC · JPL
582273	2015 RX_{203}	—	October 18, 2012	Haleakala	Pan-STARRS 1	·	740 m	MPC · JPL
582274	2015 RW_{208}	—	October 22, 2012	Haleakala	Pan-STARRS 1	·	680 m	MPC · JPL
582275	2015 RD_{210}	—	March 27, 2011	Mount Lemmon	Mount Lemmon Survey	·	530 m	MPC · JPL
582276	2015 RO_{221}	—	August 27, 2009	Kitt Peak	Spacewatch	·	2.4 km	MPC · JPL
582277	2015 RT_{223}	—	August 12, 2015	Haleakala	Pan-STARRS 1	·	2.2 km	MPC · JPL
582278	2015 RH_{227}	—	March 18, 2004	Kitt Peak	Spacewatch	·	490 m	MPC · JPL
582279	2015 RS_{228}	—	August 15, 2009	Kitt Peak	Spacewatch	·	2.6 km	MPC · JPL
582280	2015 RT_{228}	—	November 25, 2009	Kitt Peak	Spacewatch	·	640 m	MPC · JPL
582281	2015 RJ_{231}	—	February 23, 2012	Mount Lemmon	Mount Lemmon Survey	·	3.0 km	MPC · JPL
582282	2015 RO_{237}	—	September 18, 2001	Apache Point	SDSS Collaboration	·	840 m	MPC · JPL
582283	2015 RA_{240}	—	September 11, 2015	Haleakala	Pan-STARRS 1	·	1.6 km	MPC · JPL
582284	2015 RE_{243}	—	July 25, 2015	Haleakala	Pan-STARRS 1	·	2.5 km	MPC · JPL
582285	2015 RY_{243}	—	March 28, 2008	Mount Lemmon	Mount Lemmon Survey	LIX	3.0 km	MPC · JPL
582286	2015 RK_{244}	—	March 17, 2012	Mount Lemmon	Mount Lemmon Survey	·	2.7 km	MPC · JPL
582287	2015 RP_{252}	—	September 13, 2007	Kitt Peak	Spacewatch	·	980 m	MPC · JPL
582288	2015 RY_{252}	—	September 8, 2015	Haleakala	Pan-STARRS 1	·	2.5 km	MPC · JPL
582289	2015 RT_{253}	—	December 31, 2005	Kitt Peak	Spacewatch	EOS	1.9 km	MPC · JPL
582290	2015 RY_{253}	—	October 3, 2011	Mount Lemmon	Mount Lemmon Survey	V	730 m	MPC · JPL
582291	2015 RB_{257}	—	May 5, 2008	Mount Lemmon	Mount Lemmon Survey	·	2.4 km	MPC · JPL
582292	2015 RV_{257}	—	November 8, 2010	Kitt Peak	Spacewatch	·	2.3 km	MPC · JPL
582293	2015 RM_{260}	—	September 9, 2015	Haleakala	Pan-STARRS 1	·	4.0 km	MPC · JPL
582294	2015 RW_{260}	—	October 29, 2010	Mount Lemmon	Mount Lemmon Survey	·	3.3 km	MPC · JPL
582295	2015 RD_{282}	—	April 16, 2013	Cerro Tololo-DECam	DECam	·	1.6 km	MPC · JPL
582296	2015 RP_{282}	—	September 9, 2015	Haleakala	Pan-STARRS 1	H	430 m	MPC · JPL
582297	2015 RO_{289}	—	September 9, 2015	Haleakala	Pan-STARRS 1	·	2.9 km	MPC · JPL
582298	2015 RU_{303}	—	September 6, 2015	Haleakala	Pan-STARRS 1	·	2.9 km	MPC · JPL
582299	2015 RK_{304}	—	September 9, 2015	Haleakala	Pan-STARRS 1	·	1.7 km	MPC · JPL
582300	2015 RL_{306}	—	September 12, 2015	Haleakala	Pan-STARRS 1	·	2.0 km	MPC · JPL

== 582301–582400 ==
back to top

Designation			Discovery			Properties		Ref
Permanent	Provisional	Named after	Date	Site	Discoverer(s)	Category	Diam.	Ref
582301	2015 RM_{306}	—	September 9, 2015	Haleakala	Pan-STARRS 1	centaur	30 km	MPC · JPL
582302	2015 RU_{308}	—	July 28, 2014	Haleakala	Pan-STARRS 1	·	2.5 km	MPC · JPL
582303	2015 RC_{309}	—	September 11, 2015	Haleakala	Pan-STARRS 1	·	2.2 km	MPC · JPL
582304	2015 RH_{309}	—	September 12, 2015	Haleakala	Pan-STARRS 1	·	2.6 km	MPC · JPL
582305	2015 RC_{310}	—	September 6, 2015	Haleakala	Pan-STARRS 1	H	490 m	MPC · JPL
582306	2015 RO_{310}	—	September 12, 2015	Haleakala	Pan-STARRS 1	·	2.5 km	MPC · JPL
582307	2015 SN_{1}	—	November 18, 2009	Mount Lemmon	Mount Lemmon Survey	·	820 m	MPC · JPL
582308	2015 SC_{2}	—	June 19, 2014	Haleakala	Pan-STARRS 1	·	2.5 km	MPC · JPL
582309	2015 SN_{3}	—	November 21, 2007	Mount Lemmon	Mount Lemmon Survey	·	2.1 km	MPC · JPL
582310	2015 SL_{10}	—	September 11, 2015	Haleakala	Pan-STARRS 1	·	1.8 km	MPC · JPL
582311	2015 SQ_{11}	—	July 23, 2015	Haleakala	Pan-STARRS 1	·	2.7 km	MPC · JPL
582312	2015 SB_{12}	—	September 30, 2010	Mount Lemmon	Mount Lemmon Survey	·	2.4 km	MPC · JPL
582313	2015 SW_{15}	—	October 3, 2005	Kitt Peak	Spacewatch	EOS	1.5 km	MPC · JPL
582314	2015 SC_{16}	—	September 19, 2012	Mount Lemmon	Mount Lemmon Survey	·	640 m	MPC · JPL
582315	2015 SO_{18}	—	October 22, 2012	Mount Lemmon	Mount Lemmon Survey	·	520 m	MPC · JPL
582316	2015 SV_{22}	—	September 23, 2015	Haleakala	Pan-STARRS 1	·	1.5 km	MPC · JPL
582317	2015 SR_{23}	—	February 3, 2012	Haleakala	Pan-STARRS 1	·	3.0 km	MPC · JPL
582318	2015 SX_{23}	—	September 23, 2015	Haleakala	Pan-STARRS 1	·	730 m	MPC · JPL
582319	2015 ST_{28}	—	September 19, 2011	Haleakala	Pan-STARRS 1	·	1.2 km	MPC · JPL
582320	2015 SR_{29}	—	September 4, 2011	Haleakala	Pan-STARRS 1	·	890 m	MPC · JPL
582321	2015 SY_{29}	—	September 23, 2015	Haleakala	Pan-STARRS 1	·	920 m	MPC · JPL
582322	2015 SK_{39}	—	September 23, 2015	Haleakala	Pan-STARRS 1	·	550 m	MPC · JPL
582323	2015 SF_{40}	—	September 23, 2015	Mount Lemmon	Mount Lemmon Survey	·	1.8 km	MPC · JPL
582324	2015 ST_{41}	—	September 23, 2015	Haleakala	Pan-STARRS 1	·	2.4 km	MPC · JPL
582325	2015 SD_{46}	—	August 13, 2004	Cerro Tololo	Deep Ecliptic Survey	·	720 m	MPC · JPL
582326	2015 TP_{1}	—	October 1, 2015	Mount Lemmon	Mount Lemmon Survey	·	2.7 km	MPC · JPL
582327	2015 TP_{5}	—	September 14, 2006	Catalina	CSS	DOR	1.7 km	MPC · JPL
582328	2015 TM_{6}	—	June 29, 2015	Haleakala	Pan-STARRS 1	·	2.8 km	MPC · JPL
582329	2015 TT_{9}	—	July 25, 2015	Haleakala	Pan-STARRS 1	EOS	1.8 km	MPC · JPL
582330	2015 TA_{10}	—	October 11, 2010	Kitt Peak	Spacewatch	·	2.2 km	MPC · JPL
582331	2015 TU_{10}	—	July 29, 2009	Kitt Peak	Spacewatch	·	3.5 km	MPC · JPL
582332	2015 TJ_{12}	—	December 17, 2009	Mount Lemmon	Mount Lemmon Survey	·	860 m	MPC · JPL
582333	2015 TW_{18}	—	February 6, 2013	Kitt Peak	Spacewatch	·	810 m	MPC · JPL
582334	2015 TV_{19}	—	November 21, 2009	Mount Lemmon	Mount Lemmon Survey	·	620 m	MPC · JPL
582335	2015 TF_{22}	—	September 6, 2015	Haleakala	Pan-STARRS 1	·	670 m	MPC · JPL
582336	2015 TQ_{22}	—	September 14, 2002	Palomar	NEAT	·	600 m	MPC · JPL
582337	2015 TY_{28}	—	May 6, 2014	Haleakala	Pan-STARRS 1	·	1.3 km	MPC · JPL
582338	2015 TS_{34}	—	April 13, 2008	Mount Lemmon	Mount Lemmon Survey	·	3.3 km	MPC · JPL
582339	2015 TE_{36}	—	May 30, 2015	Haleakala	Pan-STARRS 1	·	1.7 km	MPC · JPL
582340	2015 TL_{37}	—	February 25, 2012	Mayhill-ISON	L. Elenin	·	4.2 km	MPC · JPL
582341	2015 TJ_{41}	—	March 13, 2013	Palomar	Palomar Transient Factory	·	1.8 km	MPC · JPL
582342	2015 TL_{43}	—	April 8, 2002	Kitt Peak	Spacewatch	·	2.4 km	MPC · JPL
582343	2015 TA_{47}	—	October 22, 2012	Mount Lemmon	Mount Lemmon Survey	·	650 m	MPC · JPL
582344	2015 TE_{51}	—	July 25, 2015	Haleakala	Pan-STARRS 1	·	2.0 km	MPC · JPL
582345	2015 TL_{54}	—	March 16, 2004	Kitt Peak	Spacewatch	·	1.5 km	MPC · JPL
582346	2015 TC_{55}	—	January 19, 2012	Kitt Peak	Spacewatch	·	3.6 km	MPC · JPL
582347	2015 TH_{55}	—	October 14, 2010	Mount Lemmon	Mount Lemmon Survey	·	2.4 km	MPC · JPL
582348	2015 TR_{58}	—	April 18, 2007	Kitt Peak	Spacewatch	·	840 m	MPC · JPL
582349	2015 TG_{60}	—	September 18, 2010	Mount Lemmon	Mount Lemmon Survey	·	2.2 km	MPC · JPL
582350	2015 TB_{62}	—	April 1, 2008	Mount Lemmon	Mount Lemmon Survey	EUP	2.9 km	MPC · JPL
582351	2015 TO_{68}	—	December 21, 2008	Kitt Peak	Spacewatch	·	940 m	MPC · JPL
582352	2015 TD_{77}	—	May 8, 2014	Haleakala	Pan-STARRS 1	·	510 m	MPC · JPL
582353	2015 TE_{81}	—	August 4, 2005	Palomar	NEAT	·	520 m	MPC · JPL
582354	2015 TA_{82}	—	November 1, 2006	Mount Lemmon	Mount Lemmon Survey	·	1.7 km	MPC · JPL
582355	2015 TD_{83}	—	September 25, 2008	Mount Lemmon	Mount Lemmon Survey	·	550 m	MPC · JPL
582356	2015 TD_{85}	—	October 3, 2006	Mount Lemmon	Mount Lemmon Survey	EUN	860 m	MPC · JPL
582357	2015 TB_{86}	—	September 29, 2009	Kitt Peak	Spacewatch	URS	2.7 km	MPC · JPL
582358	2015 TN_{88}	—	September 9, 2015	Haleakala	Pan-STARRS 1	·	660 m	MPC · JPL
582359	2015 TU_{93}	—	December 10, 2012	Kitt Peak	Spacewatch	·	690 m	MPC · JPL
582360	2015 TE_{94}	—	March 28, 2014	Haleakala	Pan-STARRS 1	·	730 m	MPC · JPL
582361	2015 TA_{95}	—	September 20, 2008	Kitt Peak	Spacewatch	·	630 m	MPC · JPL
582362	2015 TL_{96}	—	May 4, 2014	Mount Lemmon	Mount Lemmon Survey	H	380 m	MPC · JPL
582363	2015 TX_{97}	—	June 2, 2011	Haleakala	Pan-STARRS 1	·	560 m	MPC · JPL
582364	2015 TA_{99}	—	October 8, 2008	Mount Lemmon	Mount Lemmon Survey	V	480 m	MPC · JPL
582365	2015 TQ_{99}	—	November 30, 2008	Kitt Peak	Spacewatch	·	1.1 km	MPC · JPL
582366	2015 TM_{102}	—	October 8, 2015	Haleakala	Pan-STARRS 1	·	830 m	MPC · JPL
582367	2015 TO_{105}	—	June 8, 2014	Haleakala	Pan-STARRS 1	·	2.5 km	MPC · JPL
582368	2015 TH_{106}	—	September 4, 2011	Haleakala	Pan-STARRS 1	·	770 m	MPC · JPL
582369	2015 TA_{112}	—	September 18, 2011	Mount Lemmon	Mount Lemmon Survey	·	1.0 km	MPC · JPL
582370	2015 TA_{116}	—	November 21, 2014	Haleakala	Pan-STARRS 1	L5	6.5 km	MPC · JPL
582371	2015 TN_{119}	—	October 8, 2015	Haleakala	Pan-STARRS 1	PHO	940 m	MPC · JPL
582372	2015 TN_{137}	—	September 12, 2015	Haleakala	Pan-STARRS 1	·	1.4 km	MPC · JPL
582373	2015 TL_{159}	—	March 17, 2013	Mount Lemmon	Mount Lemmon Survey	KOR	1.0 km	MPC · JPL
582374	2015 TQ_{162}	—	March 26, 2008	Mount Lemmon	Mount Lemmon Survey	·	2.6 km	MPC · JPL
582375	2015 TL_{164}	—	June 29, 2015	Haleakala	Pan-STARRS 1	·	1.4 km	MPC · JPL
582376	2015 TB_{172}	—	May 11, 2010	Mount Lemmon	Mount Lemmon Survey	·	1.1 km	MPC · JPL
582377	2015 TN_{180}	—	November 17, 2011	Kitt Peak	Spacewatch	EOS	1.9 km	MPC · JPL
582378	2015 TT_{180}	—	February 14, 2013	Kitt Peak	Spacewatch	·	2.9 km	MPC · JPL
582379	2015 TN_{193}	—	August 28, 2015	Haleakala	Pan-STARRS 1	·	2.5 km	MPC · JPL
582380	2015 TV_{193}	—	September 27, 2009	Catalina	CSS	·	3.2 km	MPC · JPL
582381	2015 TM_{194}	—	November 22, 2008	Kitt Peak	Spacewatch	·	1.3 km	MPC · JPL
582382	2015 TD_{196}	—	October 9, 2004	Kitt Peak	Spacewatch	EOS	1.8 km	MPC · JPL
582383	2015 TM_{201}	—	July 25, 2015	Haleakala	Pan-STARRS 1	·	3.2 km	MPC · JPL
582384	2015 TN_{201}	—	October 28, 2011	Mount Lemmon	Mount Lemmon Survey	·	1.1 km	MPC · JPL
582385	2015 TE_{202}	—	November 26, 2005	Mount Lemmon	Mount Lemmon Survey	·	690 m	MPC · JPL
582386	2015 TH_{202}	—	November 22, 2009	Kitt Peak	Spacewatch	·	750 m	MPC · JPL
582387	2015 TS_{205}	—	September 4, 2002	Palomar	NEAT	·	650 m	MPC · JPL
582388	2015 TC_{210}	—	September 25, 2012	Mount Lemmon	Mount Lemmon Survey	·	580 m	MPC · JPL
582389	2015 TU_{216}	—	September 30, 2005	Mount Lemmon	Mount Lemmon Survey	·	420 m	MPC · JPL
582390	2015 TX_{220}	—	September 20, 2008	Mount Lemmon	Mount Lemmon Survey	·	610 m	MPC · JPL
582391	2015 TB_{221}	—	April 19, 2007	Kitt Peak	Spacewatch	·	780 m	MPC · JPL
582392	2015 TY_{221}	—	February 26, 2007	Mount Lemmon	Mount Lemmon Survey	·	500 m	MPC · JPL
582393	2015 TR_{223}	—	September 28, 2011	Mount Lemmon	Mount Lemmon Survey	·	870 m	MPC · JPL
582394	2015 TR_{241}	—	March 6, 2002	Siding Spring	R. H. McNaught	·	810 m	MPC · JPL
582395	2015 TK_{244}	—	August 30, 2011	Haleakala	Pan-STARRS 1	·	1.1 km	MPC · JPL
582396	2015 TU_{251}	—	May 1, 1994	Kitt Peak	Spacewatch	·	620 m	MPC · JPL
582397	2015 TP_{256}	—	December 25, 2010	Mount Lemmon	Mount Lemmon Survey	·	2.5 km	MPC · JPL
582398	2015 TR_{258}	—	September 12, 2002	Palomar	NEAT	·	1.3 km	MPC · JPL
582399	2015 TF_{259}	—	October 11, 2015	Space Surveillance	Space Surveillance Telescope	H	420 m	MPC · JPL
582400	2015 TO_{261}	—	September 6, 2015	Haleakala	Pan-STARRS 1	·	1.8 km	MPC · JPL

== 582401–582500 ==
back to top

Designation			Discovery			Properties		Ref
Permanent	Provisional	Named after	Date	Site	Discoverer(s)	Category	Diam.	Ref
582401	2015 TJ_{263}	—	October 12, 2015	Haleakala	Pan-STARRS 1	·	2.2 km	MPC · JPL
582402	2015 TE_{264}	—	October 2, 2009	Mount Lemmon	Mount Lemmon Survey	·	4.4 km	MPC · JPL
582403	2015 TO_{264}	—	April 30, 2014	Haleakala	Pan-STARRS 1	V	520 m	MPC · JPL
582404	2015 TE_{270}	—	September 29, 2009	Mount Lemmon	Mount Lemmon Survey	·	3.5 km	MPC · JPL
582405	2015 TL_{272}	—	November 6, 2010	Mount Lemmon	Mount Lemmon Survey	·	2.5 km	MPC · JPL
582406	2015 TL_{274}	—	October 2, 2015	Mount Lemmon	Mount Lemmon Survey	EOS	1.6 km	MPC · JPL
582407	2015 TC_{275}	—	October 26, 2008	Mount Lemmon	Mount Lemmon Survey	·	740 m	MPC · JPL
582408	2015 TN_{275}	—	March 29, 2014	Mount Lemmon	Mount Lemmon Survey	·	560 m	MPC · JPL
582409	2015 TP_{277}	—	October 9, 2015	XuYi	PMO NEO Survey Program	·	1.0 km	MPC · JPL
582410	2015 TD_{281}	—	April 10, 2013	Haleakala	Pan-STARRS 1	·	2.1 km	MPC · JPL
582411	2015 TP_{287}	—	November 1, 2011	Mount Lemmon	Mount Lemmon Survey	·	1.9 km	MPC · JPL
582412	2015 TQ_{288}	—	July 25, 2015	Haleakala	Pan-STARRS 1	·	690 m	MPC · JPL
582413	2015 TJ_{289}	—	April 5, 2014	Haleakala	Pan-STARRS 1	·	1.5 km	MPC · JPL
582414	2015 TC_{291}	—	May 24, 2014	Mount Lemmon	Mount Lemmon Survey	·	2.0 km	MPC · JPL
582415	2015 TR_{291}	—	October 2, 2015	Mount Lemmon	Mount Lemmon Survey	·	530 m	MPC · JPL
582416	2015 TL_{292}	—	March 13, 2011	Mount Lemmon	Mount Lemmon Survey	·	480 m	MPC · JPL
582417	2015 TM_{292}	—	December 3, 2010	Kitt Peak	Spacewatch	·	3.1 km	MPC · JPL
582418	2015 TN_{293}	—	April 13, 2013	Haleakala	Pan-STARRS 1	·	2.6 km	MPC · JPL
582419	2015 TP_{294}	—	May 6, 2014	Haleakala	Pan-STARRS 1	·	2.2 km	MPC · JPL
582420	2015 TJ_{297}	—	September 11, 2015	Haleakala	Pan-STARRS 1	·	2.3 km	MPC · JPL
582421	2015 TY_{300}	—	June 6, 2011	Haleakala	Pan-STARRS 1	·	620 m	MPC · JPL
582422	2015 TZ_{317}	—	April 23, 2014	Mount Lemmon	Mount Lemmon Survey	·	530 m	MPC · JPL
582423	2015 TA_{322}	—	December 2, 2008	Mount Lemmon	Mount Lemmon Survey	·	1.2 km	MPC · JPL
582424	2015 TU_{326}	—	August 21, 2015	Haleakala	Pan-STARRS 1	·	2.5 km	MPC · JPL
582425	2015 TK_{328}	—	February 1, 2012	Mount Lemmon	Mount Lemmon Survey	·	2.5 km	MPC · JPL
582426	2015 TT_{328}	—	June 28, 2014	Haleakala	Pan-STARRS 1	·	1.4 km	MPC · JPL
582427	2015 TX_{330}	—	August 21, 2015	Haleakala	Pan-STARRS 1	·	1.4 km	MPC · JPL
582428	2015 TH_{334}	—	August 21, 2015	Haleakala	Pan-STARRS 1	·	2.1 km	MPC · JPL
582429	2015 TM_{337}	—	February 8, 2013	Kitt Peak	Spacewatch	EOS	1.9 km	MPC · JPL
582430	2015 TR_{341}	—	May 9, 2014	Mount Lemmon	Mount Lemmon Survey	·	1.7 km	MPC · JPL
582431	2015 TV_{343}	—	October 2, 2006	Mount Lemmon	Mount Lemmon Survey	·	1.5 km	MPC · JPL
582432	2015 TE_{350}	—	October 11, 2015	Oukaïmeden	C. Rinner	THM	2.0 km	MPC · JPL
582433	2015 TN_{352}	—	October 8, 2015	Haleakala	Pan-STARRS 1	H	490 m	MPC · JPL
582434	2015 TK_{365}	—	March 13, 2007	Mount Lemmon	Mount Lemmon Survey	·	870 m	MPC · JPL
582435	2015 TL_{368}	—	October 11, 2015	XuYi	PMO NEO Survey Program	·	2.8 km	MPC · JPL
582436	2015 TH_{369}	—	April 14, 2010	Mount Lemmon	Mount Lemmon Survey	·	900 m	MPC · JPL
582437	2015 TT_{369}	—	October 12, 2015	Haleakala	Pan-STARRS 1	·	2.0 km	MPC · JPL
582438	2015 TK_{372}	—	November 25, 2005	Mount Lemmon	Mount Lemmon Survey	·	560 m	MPC · JPL
582439	2015 TR_{377}	—	May 23, 2014	Haleakala	Pan-STARRS 1	·	490 m	MPC · JPL
582440	2015 TB_{386}	—	September 30, 2010	Mount Lemmon	Mount Lemmon Survey	·	1.6 km	MPC · JPL
582441	2015 TB_{400}	—	December 8, 2005	Kitt Peak	Spacewatch	H	410 m	MPC · JPL
582442	2015 TN_{409}	—	October 3, 2015	Mount Lemmon	Mount Lemmon Survey	·	2.2 km	MPC · JPL
582443	2015 TL_{411}	—	October 15, 2015	Haleakala	Pan-STARRS 1	HYG	2.1 km	MPC · JPL
582444	2015 TH_{412}	—	October 10, 2015	Haleakala	Pan-STARRS 1	·	1.8 km	MPC · JPL
582445	2015 TU_{413}	—	October 10, 2015	Haleakala	Pan-STARRS 1	·	500 m	MPC · JPL
582446	2015 TQ_{416}	—	October 11, 2015	Mount Lemmon	Mount Lemmon Survey	·	2.5 km	MPC · JPL
582447	2015 TT_{416}	—	October 8, 2015	Haleakala	Pan-STARRS 1	L5	6.6 km	MPC · JPL
582448	2015 TJ_{418}	—	October 1, 2015	Mount Lemmon	Mount Lemmon Survey	·	1.5 km	MPC · JPL
582449	2015 TR_{443}	—	October 10, 2015	Haleakala	Pan-STARRS 1	·	850 m	MPC · JPL
582450	2015 TH_{444}	—	August 21, 2015	Haleakala	Pan-STARRS 1	·	560 m	MPC · JPL
582451	2015 UV_{2}	—	January 28, 2007	Kitt Peak	Spacewatch	·	530 m	MPC · JPL
582452	2015 UW_{4}	—	September 20, 2011	Kitt Peak	Spacewatch	·	1.3 km	MPC · JPL
582453	2015 UW_{6}	—	November 15, 2010	Mount Lemmon	Mount Lemmon Survey	·	3.0 km	MPC · JPL
582454	2015 UF_{7}	—	October 10, 2007	Catalina	CSS	T_{j} (2.96) · 3:2	4.3 km	MPC · JPL
582455	2015 UZ_{10}	—	September 12, 2015	Haleakala	Pan-STARRS 1	·	2.1 km	MPC · JPL
582456	2015 UX_{11}	—	November 5, 2004	Palomar	NEAT	·	3.0 km	MPC · JPL
582457	2015 UM_{14}	—	October 22, 2012	Haleakala	Pan-STARRS 1	·	650 m	MPC · JPL
582458	2015 UW_{16}	—	September 12, 2015	Haleakala	Pan-STARRS 1	·	2.4 km	MPC · JPL
582459	2015 UZ_{23}	—	August 30, 2005	Kitt Peak	Spacewatch	·	510 m	MPC · JPL
582460	2015 UG_{31}	—	April 28, 2011	Mount Lemmon	Mount Lemmon Survey	·	480 m	MPC · JPL
582461	2015 UK_{36}	—	December 18, 2009	Mount Lemmon	Mount Lemmon Survey	·	470 m	MPC · JPL
582462	2015 UL_{47}	—	May 31, 2014	Haleakala	Pan-STARRS 1	·	2.3 km	MPC · JPL
582463	2015 UX_{48}	—	October 18, 2015	Haleakala	Pan-STARRS 1	·	2.4 km	MPC · JPL
582464	2015 UM_{49}	—	May 23, 2014	Haleakala	Pan-STARRS 1	·	1.0 km	MPC · JPL
582465	2015 UK_{53}	—	September 17, 2004	Kitt Peak	Spacewatch	THM	3.1 km	MPC · JPL
582466	2015 UO_{54}	—	September 9, 2015	Haleakala	Pan-STARRS 1	MAS	620 m	MPC · JPL
582467	2015 UV_{58}	—	September 12, 2015	Haleakala	Pan-STARRS 1	·	1.8 km	MPC · JPL
582468	2015 UY_{64}	—	October 10, 2015	Haleakala	Pan-STARRS 1	·	2.8 km	MPC · JPL
582469	2015 UP_{72}	—	April 5, 2008	Mount Lemmon	Mount Lemmon Survey	EOS	1.8 km	MPC · JPL
582470	2015 UB_{74}	—	September 21, 2009	Mount Lemmon	Mount Lemmon Survey	·	2.5 km	MPC · JPL
582471	2015 UB_{75}	—	October 9, 2008	Mount Lemmon	Mount Lemmon Survey	·	790 m	MPC · JPL
582472	2015 UM_{75}	—	August 17, 2009	Kitt Peak	Spacewatch	·	2.7 km	MPC · JPL
582473	2015 UR_{88}	—	October 19, 2015	Haleakala	Pan-STARRS 1	V	490 m	MPC · JPL
582474	2015 UG_{97}	—	October 23, 2015	Mount Lemmon	Mount Lemmon Survey	·	540 m	MPC · JPL
582475	2015 VN_{2}	—	July 30, 2012	Haleakala	Pan-STARRS 1	H	610 m	MPC · JPL
582476	2015 VP_{12}	—	March 13, 2013	Kitt Peak	Spacewatch	·	2.2 km	MPC · JPL
582477	2015 VS_{23}	—	March 19, 2013	Haleakala	Pan-STARRS 1	·	2.1 km	MPC · JPL
582478	2015 VA_{28}	—	September 25, 2009	Kitt Peak	Spacewatch	·	2.7 km	MPC · JPL
582479	2015 VY_{29}	—	December 21, 2012	Mount Lemmon	Mount Lemmon Survey	·	510 m	MPC · JPL
582480	2015 VE_{32}	—	February 15, 2010	Mount Lemmon	Mount Lemmon Survey	·	560 m	MPC · JPL
582481	2015 VA_{34}	—	March 16, 2004	Mauna Kea	D. D. Balam	·	780 m	MPC · JPL
582482	2015 VU_{34}	—	September 23, 2008	Kitt Peak	Spacewatch	·	660 m	MPC · JPL
582483	2015 VF_{48}	—	May 6, 2014	Haleakala	Pan-STARRS 1	·	2.2 km	MPC · JPL
582484	2015 VN_{50}	—	November 2, 2010	Mount Lemmon	Mount Lemmon Survey	VER	2.3 km	MPC · JPL
582485	2015 VC_{55}	—	March 31, 2008	Kitt Peak	Spacewatch	·	610 m	MPC · JPL
582486	2015 VE_{67}	—	November 2, 2015	Haleakala	Pan-STARRS 1	·	470 m	MPC · JPL
582487	2015 VO_{75}	—	November 6, 2015	Catalina	CSS	·	690 m	MPC · JPL
582488	2015 VQ_{77}	—	October 7, 2007	Mount Lemmon	Mount Lemmon Survey	HNS	1.5 km	MPC · JPL
582489	2015 VK_{79}	—	September 9, 2015	Haleakala	Pan-STARRS 1	EOS	1.5 km	MPC · JPL
582490	2015 VE_{83}	—	May 4, 2014	Haleakala	Pan-STARRS 1	·	580 m	MPC · JPL
582491	2015 VE_{85}	—	August 31, 2005	Palomar Mountain	NEAT	·	580 m	MPC · JPL
582492	2015 VC_{87}	—	January 11, 2010	Kitt Peak	Spacewatch	·	510 m	MPC · JPL
582493	2015 VQ_{89}	—	October 4, 2002	Palomar	NEAT	·	640 m	MPC · JPL
582494	2015 VV_{89}	—	October 27, 2012	Mount Lemmon	Mount Lemmon Survey	·	760 m	MPC · JPL
582495	2015 VX_{90}	—	March 10, 2010	La Sagra	OAM	·	610 m	MPC · JPL
582496	2015 VG_{94}	—	April 8, 2010	Kitt Peak	Spacewatch	·	1.2 km	MPC · JPL
582497	2015 VG_{106}	—	February 13, 2010	Mount Lemmon	Mount Lemmon Survey	·	590 m	MPC · JPL
582498	2015 VO_{110}	—	August 27, 2005	Palomar	NEAT	·	590 m	MPC · JPL
582499	2015 VK_{118}	—	December 7, 2004	Socorro	LINEAR	·	2.9 km	MPC · JPL
582500	2015 VA_{119}	—	December 23, 2012	Haleakala	Pan-STARRS 1	·	590 m	MPC · JPL

== 582501–582600 ==
back to top

Designation			Discovery			Properties		Ref
Permanent	Provisional	Named after	Date	Site	Discoverer(s)	Category	Diam.	Ref
582501	2015 VG_{124}	—	November 19, 2008	Catalina	CSS	PHO	1.3 km	MPC · JPL
582502	2015 VU_{129}	—	September 6, 2008	Kitt Peak	Spacewatch	·	590 m	MPC · JPL
582503	2015 VY_{131}	—	December 1, 2008	Mount Lemmon	Mount Lemmon Survey	·	1.1 km	MPC · JPL
582504	2015 VZ_{132}	—	August 24, 2008	Kitt Peak	Spacewatch	BAP	530 m	MPC · JPL
582505	2015 VC_{137}	—	December 12, 2004	Anderson Mesa	LONEOS	PHO	1.3 km	MPC · JPL
582506	2015 VC_{143}	—	October 7, 2005	Mauna Kea	A. Boattini	·	3.2 km	MPC · JPL
582507	2015 VW_{143}	—	November 9, 1996	Kitt Peak	Spacewatch	·	770 m	MPC · JPL
582508	2015 VV_{144}	—	September 3, 2014	Catalina	CSS	·	3.5 km	MPC · JPL
582509	2015 VC_{148}	—	September 23, 2008	Mount Lemmon	Mount Lemmon Survey	V	470 m	MPC · JPL
582510	2015 VA_{156}	—	July 30, 2008	Mount Lemmon	Mount Lemmon Survey	·	650 m	MPC · JPL
582511	2015 VO_{157}	—	January 2, 2009	Mount Lemmon	Mount Lemmon Survey	V	450 m	MPC · JPL
582512	2015 VS_{162}	—	November 10, 2015	Mount Lemmon	Mount Lemmon Survey	·	620 m	MPC · JPL
582513	2015 VO_{163}	—	May 3, 2013	Haleakala	Pan-STARRS 1	·	890 m	MPC · JPL
582514	2015 VO_{175}	—	September 6, 2008	Kitt Peak	Spacewatch	·	490 m	MPC · JPL
582515	2015 VN_{177}	—	November 2, 2015	Mount Lemmon	Mount Lemmon Survey	H	440 m	MPC · JPL
582516	2015 VN_{186}	—	November 10, 2015	Mount Lemmon	Mount Lemmon Survey	·	790 m	MPC · JPL
582517	2015 VR_{186}	—	November 14, 2015	Mount Lemmon	Mount Lemmon Survey	PHO	690 m	MPC · JPL
582518	2015 VR_{196}	—	November 7, 2015	Mount Lemmon	Mount Lemmon Survey	·	1.7 km	MPC · JPL
582519	2015 WU_{18}	—	January 31, 2009	Mount Lemmon	Mount Lemmon Survey	V	500 m	MPC · JPL
582520	2015 WZ_{18}	—	January 7, 2006	Kitt Peak	Spacewatch	(2076)	610 m	MPC · JPL
582521	2015 WY_{27}	—	November 22, 2015	Mount Lemmon	Mount Lemmon Survey	EOS	1.5 km	MPC · JPL
582522	2015 XD_{3}	—	January 11, 2010	Kitt Peak	Spacewatch	·	640 m	MPC · JPL
582523	2015 XJ_{3}	—	July 25, 2015	Haleakala	Pan-STARRS 1	·	1.6 km	MPC · JPL
582524	2015 XV_{3}	—	February 26, 2007	Mount Lemmon	Mount Lemmon Survey	·	500 m	MPC · JPL
582525	2015 XZ_{3}	—	October 22, 2006	Kitt Peak	Spacewatch	·	1.9 km	MPC · JPL
582526	2015 XC_{4}	—	February 8, 2013	Haleakala	Pan-STARRS 1	V	430 m	MPC · JPL
582527	2015 XN_{10}	—	August 31, 2005	Palomar	NEAT	·	630 m	MPC · JPL
582528	2015 XO_{10}	—	August 20, 2011	Haleakala	Pan-STARRS 1	V	570 m	MPC · JPL
582529	2015 XW_{10}	—	September 23, 2015	Haleakala	Pan-STARRS 1	·	3.0 km	MPC · JPL
582530	2015 XD_{11}	—	April 25, 2007	Mount Lemmon	Mount Lemmon Survey	·	5.0 km	MPC · JPL
582531	2015 XJ_{11}	—	April 26, 2008	Kitt Peak	Spacewatch	·	3.3 km	MPC · JPL
582532	2015 XQ_{11}	—	December 31, 2011	Kitt Peak	Spacewatch	EOS	2.0 km	MPC · JPL
582533	2015 XN_{12}	—	October 1, 2015	Mount Lemmon	Mount Lemmon Survey	·	2.8 km	MPC · JPL
582534	2015 XF_{17}	—	April 27, 2001	Kitt Peak	Spacewatch	·	540 m	MPC · JPL
582535	2015 XR_{21}	—	November 3, 2005	Mount Lemmon	Mount Lemmon Survey	·	650 m	MPC · JPL
582536	2015 XN_{22}	—	August 28, 2014	Haleakala	Pan-STARRS 1	·	2.8 km	MPC · JPL
582537	2015 XZ_{23}	—	October 8, 2015	Haleakala	Pan-STARRS 1	·	710 m	MPC · JPL
582538	2015 XH_{29}	—	October 9, 2015	Haleakala	Pan-STARRS 1	·	940 m	MPC · JPL
582539	2015 XH_{34}	—	October 8, 2015	Haleakala	Pan-STARRS 1	·	660 m	MPC · JPL
582540	2015 XM_{38}	—	November 8, 2007	Kitt Peak	Spacewatch	·	830 m	MPC · JPL
582541	2015 XO_{41}	—	October 30, 2008	Kitt Peak	Spacewatch	·	560 m	MPC · JPL
582542	2015 XX_{55}	—	March 26, 2003	Palomar	NEAT	·	680 m	MPC · JPL
582543	2015 XL_{58}	—	April 16, 2007	Catalina	CSS	·	740 m	MPC · JPL
582544	2015 XN_{65}	—	April 1, 2012	Mount Lemmon	Mount Lemmon Survey	EOS	1.5 km	MPC · JPL
582545	2015 XR_{66}	—	October 25, 2008	Catalina	CSS	·	650 m	MPC · JPL
582546	2015 XX_{67}	—	December 26, 2005	Kitt Peak	Spacewatch	·	680 m	MPC · JPL
582547	2015 XB_{70}	—	December 2, 2015	Haleakala	Pan-STARRS 1	·	1.1 km	MPC · JPL
582548	2015 XX_{79}	—	September 8, 2011	Kitt Peak	Spacewatch	·	1.0 km	MPC · JPL
582549	2015 XC_{89}	—	December 4, 2015	Haleakala	Pan-STARRS 1	·	2.7 km	MPC · JPL
582550	2015 XC_{94}	—	October 26, 2008	Mount Lemmon	Mount Lemmon Survey	·	670 m	MPC · JPL
582551	2015 XN_{95}	—	July 28, 2011	Haleakala	Pan-STARRS 1	·	570 m	MPC · JPL
582552	2015 XK_{100}	—	July 30, 2005	Palomar	NEAT	·	480 m	MPC · JPL
582553	2015 XE_{101}	—	March 12, 2010	Catalina	CSS	(2076)	840 m	MPC · JPL
582554	2015 XY_{106}	—	September 25, 2011	Haleakala	Pan-STARRS 1	·	1.0 km	MPC · JPL
582555	2015 XV_{116}	—	September 29, 2008	Mount Lemmon	Mount Lemmon Survey	·	670 m	MPC · JPL
582556	2015 XD_{120}	—	November 23, 2015	Haleakala	Pan-STARRS 1	·	2.5 km	MPC · JPL
582557	2015 XB_{124}	—	September 29, 2011	Mount Lemmon	Mount Lemmon Survey	·	680 m	MPC · JPL
582558	2015 XQ_{130}	—	September 24, 2008	Mount Lemmon	Mount Lemmon Survey	·	490 m	MPC · JPL
582559	2015 XW_{131}	—	December 22, 2008	Mount Lemmon	Mount Lemmon Survey	·	970 m	MPC · JPL
582560	2015 XG_{132}	—	October 8, 2015	Mount Lemmon	Mount Lemmon Survey	·	670 m	MPC · JPL
582561	2015 XT_{136}	—	November 6, 2015	Haleakala	Pan-STARRS 1	V	640 m	MPC · JPL
582562	2015 XZ_{138}	—	October 1, 2011	Kitt Peak	Spacewatch	·	1.0 km	MPC · JPL
582563	2015 XB_{140}	—	October 26, 2008	Kitt Peak	Spacewatch	·	580 m	MPC · JPL
582564	2015 XF_{141}	—	February 14, 2005	Kitt Peak	Spacewatch	MAS	710 m	MPC · JPL
582565	2015 XL_{144}	—	November 22, 2015	Mount Lemmon	Mount Lemmon Survey	·	620 m	MPC · JPL
582566	2015 XD_{146}	—	November 3, 2007	Kitt Peak	Spacewatch	·	730 m	MPC · JPL
582567	2015 XP_{146}	—	December 4, 2015	Haleakala	Pan-STARRS 1	·	990 m	MPC · JPL
582568	2015 XP_{148}	—	June 6, 2011	Haleakala	Pan-STARRS 1	·	500 m	MPC · JPL
582569	2015 XB_{154}	—	November 20, 2015	Mount Lemmon	Mount Lemmon Survey	·	1.3 km	MPC · JPL
582570	2015 XV_{161}	—	September 23, 2015	Haleakala	Pan-STARRS 1	EOS	1.5 km	MPC · JPL
582571	2015 XF_{167}	—	February 15, 2013	Haleakala	Pan-STARRS 1	PHO	900 m	MPC · JPL
582572	2015 XT_{187}	—	May 13, 2007	Mount Lemmon	Mount Lemmon Survey	·	550 m	MPC · JPL
582573	2015 XU_{191}	—	December 28, 2005	Kitt Peak	Spacewatch	·	650 m	MPC · JPL
582574	2015 XK_{197}	—	January 10, 2007	Kitt Peak	Spacewatch	·	1.8 km	MPC · JPL
582575	2015 XN_{197}	—	June 11, 2011	Haleakala	Pan-STARRS 1	·	870 m	MPC · JPL
582576	2015 XK_{203}	—	April 18, 2013	Mount Lemmon	Mount Lemmon Survey	·	1.9 km	MPC · JPL
582577	2015 XL_{203}	—	April 16, 2012	Haleakala	Pan-STARRS 1	·	1.8 km	MPC · JPL
582578	2015 XR_{203}	—	January 13, 2011	Mount Lemmon	Mount Lemmon Survey	·	2.7 km	MPC · JPL
582579	2015 XC_{212}	—	November 11, 2004	Kitt Peak	Spacewatch	·	1.3 km	MPC · JPL
582580	2015 XB_{215}	—	October 3, 2011	Mount Lemmon	Mount Lemmon Survey	·	800 m	MPC · JPL
582581	2015 XX_{219}	—	January 20, 2009	Kitt Peak	Spacewatch	NYS	1.1 km	MPC · JPL
582582	2015 XT_{226}	—	June 1, 2014	Haleakala	Pan-STARRS 1	·	2.6 km	MPC · JPL
582583	2015 XH_{229}	—	January 23, 2011	Mount Lemmon	Mount Lemmon Survey	THM	1.6 km	MPC · JPL
582584	2015 XD_{239}	—	December 21, 2008	Mount Lemmon	Mount Lemmon Survey	·	760 m	MPC · JPL
582585	2015 XN_{248}	—	April 17, 2009	Mount Lemmon	Mount Lemmon Survey	·	2.2 km	MPC · JPL
582586	2015 XO_{268}	—	May 21, 2014	Haleakala	Pan-STARRS 1	·	570 m	MPC · JPL
582587	2015 XD_{273}	—	December 3, 2015	Mount Lemmon	Mount Lemmon Survey	·	680 m	MPC · JPL
582588	2015 XG_{287}	—	July 7, 2014	Haleakala	Pan-STARRS 1	·	800 m	MPC · JPL
582589	2015 XB_{291}	—	July 1, 2011	Kitt Peak	Spacewatch	·	420 m	MPC · JPL
582590	2015 XF_{292}	—	June 18, 2013	Haleakala	Pan-STARRS 1	3:2	3.8 km	MPC · JPL
582591	2015 XJ_{317}	—	May 10, 2003	Kitt Peak	Spacewatch	·	550 m	MPC · JPL
582592	2015 XH_{320}	—	December 8, 2015	Haleakala	Pan-STARRS 1	·	840 m	MPC · JPL
582593	2015 XO_{321}	—	August 30, 2014	Mount Lemmon	Mount Lemmon Survey	·	810 m	MPC · JPL
582594	2015 XN_{334}	—	June 20, 2014	Haleakala	Pan-STARRS 1	·	630 m	MPC · JPL
582595	2015 XO_{334}	—	July 4, 2014	Haleakala	Pan-STARRS 1	·	1.8 km	MPC · JPL
582596	2015 XV_{336}	—	March 23, 2013	Mount Lemmon	Mount Lemmon Survey	·	750 m	MPC · JPL
582597	2015 XR_{344}	—	September 17, 2014	Haleakala	Pan-STARRS 1	·	920 m	MPC · JPL
582598	2015 XE_{357}	—	November 15, 2015	Haleakala	Pan-STARRS 1	H	370 m	MPC · JPL
582599	2015 XT_{357}	—	February 16, 2013	Mount Lemmon	Mount Lemmon Survey	·	1.4 km	MPC · JPL
582600	2015 XK_{359}	—	April 17, 2013	Haleakala	Pan-STARRS 1	·	1.2 km	MPC · JPL

== 582601–582700 ==
back to top

Designation			Discovery			Properties		Ref
Permanent	Provisional	Named after	Date	Site	Discoverer(s)	Category	Diam.	Ref
582601	2015 XB_{362}	—	September 20, 2011	Kitt Peak	Spacewatch	·	910 m	MPC · JPL
582602	2015 XY_{364}	—	October 22, 2008	Kitt Peak	Spacewatch	·	540 m	MPC · JPL
582603	2015 XB_{365}	—	October 30, 2002	Palomar	NEAT	·	600 m	MPC · JPL
582604	2015 XJ_{367}	—	November 7, 2008	Mount Lemmon	Mount Lemmon Survey	·	530 m	MPC · JPL
582605	2015 XQ_{367}	—	October 22, 2008	Kitt Peak	Spacewatch	·	530 m	MPC · JPL
582606	2015 XV_{376}	—	November 21, 2008	Kitt Peak	Spacewatch	V	610 m	MPC · JPL
582607	2015 XZ_{380}	—	September 29, 2010	Mount Lemmon	Mount Lemmon Survey	MRX	770 m	MPC · JPL
582608	2015 XC_{382}	—	October 25, 2011	Haleakala	Pan-STARRS 1	·	1.2 km	MPC · JPL
582609	2015 XV_{382}	—	January 13, 2013	ESA OGS	ESA OGS	·	560 m	MPC · JPL
582610	2015 XY_{388}	—	December 9, 2015	Haleakala	Pan-STARRS 1	H	400 m	MPC · JPL
582611	2015 XD_{390}	—	October 1, 2011	Kitt Peak	Spacewatch	·	650 m	MPC · JPL
582612	2015 XM_{392}	—	December 9, 2015	Haleakala	Pan-STARRS 1	PHO	830 m	MPC · JPL
582613	2015 XA_{394}	—	December 13, 2015	Haleakala	Pan-STARRS 1	EUN	900 m	MPC · JPL
582614	2015 XW_{394}	—	September 4, 2011	Haleakala	Pan-STARRS 1	(2076)	820 m	MPC · JPL
582615	2015 XJ_{396}	—	December 9, 2015	Haleakala	Pan-STARRS 1	·	1.3 km	MPC · JPL
582616	2015 XE_{398}	—	January 25, 2012	Haleakala	Pan-STARRS 1	·	900 m	MPC · JPL
582617	2015 XO_{398}	—	July 13, 2013	Mount Lemmon	Mount Lemmon Survey	·	1.3 km	MPC · JPL
582618	2015 XS_{398}	—	May 31, 2008	Mount Lemmon	Mount Lemmon Survey	JUN	1.0 km	MPC · JPL
582619	2015 XX_{398}	—	November 16, 2014	Mount Lemmon	Mount Lemmon Survey	BRG	1.4 km	MPC · JPL
582620	2015 XY_{398}	—	December 13, 2015	Haleakala	Pan-STARRS 1	·	1.4 km	MPC · JPL
582621	2015 XZ_{398}	—	February 29, 2012	Mount Lemmon	Mount Lemmon Survey	·	1.2 km	MPC · JPL
582622	2015 XU_{400}	—	August 28, 2014	Haleakala	Pan-STARRS 1	PHO	930 m	MPC · JPL
582623	2015 XO_{403}	—	October 1, 2014	Mount Lemmon	Mount Lemmon Survey	·	1.1 km	MPC · JPL
582624	2015 XL_{409}	—	January 18, 2012	Catalina	CSS	·	1.2 km	MPC · JPL
582625	2015 XF_{410}	—	July 31, 2014	Haleakala	Pan-STARRS 1	·	1.2 km	MPC · JPL
582626	2015 XF_{413}	—	January 15, 2005	Kitt Peak	Spacewatch	·	1.0 km	MPC · JPL
582627	2015 XQ_{417}	—	December 3, 2010	Mount Lemmon	Mount Lemmon Survey	·	1.2 km	MPC · JPL
582628	2015 XM_{418}	—	September 1, 2005	Palomar	NEAT	EUN	1.2 km	MPC · JPL
582629	2015 XN_{418}	—	December 14, 2010	Mount Lemmon	Mount Lemmon Survey	·	1.4 km	MPC · JPL
582630	2015 XC_{419}	—	November 11, 2010	Mount Lemmon	Mount Lemmon Survey	EUN	1.1 km	MPC · JPL
582631	2015 XE_{420}	—	October 26, 2014	Mount Lemmon	Mount Lemmon Survey	·	1.7 km	MPC · JPL
582632	2015 XK_{420}	—	December 10, 2015	Mount Lemmon	Mount Lemmon Survey	PHO	960 m	MPC · JPL
582633	2015 XL_{422}	—	December 8, 2015	Haleakala	Pan-STARRS 1	H	470 m	MPC · JPL
582634	2015 XY_{423}	—	December 9, 2015	Haleakala	Pan-STARRS 1	H	360 m	MPC · JPL
582635	2015 XH_{444}	—	December 13, 2015	Haleakala	Pan-STARRS 1	HNS	970 m	MPC · JPL
582636	2015 XD_{446}	—	December 8, 2015	Mount Lemmon	Mount Lemmon Survey	L5	7.1 km	MPC · JPL
582637	2015 XT_{448}	—	December 4, 2015	Haleakala	Pan-STARRS 1	L5	7.4 km	MPC · JPL
582638	2015 YG_{3}	—	December 16, 2015	Mount Lemmon	Mount Lemmon Survey	·	1.1 km	MPC · JPL
582639	2015 YE_{9}	—	September 13, 2007	Mount Lemmon	Mount Lemmon Survey	NYS	1.1 km	MPC · JPL
582640	2015 YK_{10}	—	December 30, 2015	Mount Lemmon	Mount Lemmon Survey	H	390 m	MPC · JPL
582641	2015 YX_{13}	—	January 20, 2009	Mount Lemmon	Mount Lemmon Survey	·	880 m	MPC · JPL
582642	2015 YO_{22}	—	December 18, 2015	Mount Lemmon	Mount Lemmon Survey	PHO	930 m	MPC · JPL
582643	2015 YC_{23}	—	March 16, 2005	Mount Lemmon	Mount Lemmon Survey	MAS	740 m	MPC · JPL
582644	2015 YT_{23}	—	April 12, 2013	Haleakala	Pan-STARRS 1	·	950 m	MPC · JPL
582645	2015 YA_{25}	—	August 23, 2014	Haleakala	Pan-STARRS 1	·	1.2 km	MPC · JPL
582646	2015 YE_{26}	—	October 25, 2011	Haleakala	Pan-STARRS 1	·	910 m	MPC · JPL
582647	2015 YH_{26}	—	April 19, 2009	Mount Lemmon	Mount Lemmon Survey	MAS	560 m	MPC · JPL
582648	2015 YC_{27}	—	April 21, 2009	Kitt Peak	Spacewatch	MAS	590 m	MPC · JPL
582649	2015 YK_{28}	—	December 18, 2015	Mount Lemmon	Mount Lemmon Survey	·	1.1 km	MPC · JPL
582650	2016 AG_{3}	—	September 26, 2011	Bergisch Gladbach	W. Bickel	·	1.1 km	MPC · JPL
582651	2016 AC_{6}	—	December 30, 2008	Mount Lemmon	Mount Lemmon Survey	·	1.0 km	MPC · JPL
582652	2016 AO_{7}	—	December 9, 2015	Mount Lemmon	Mount Lemmon Survey	·	680 m	MPC · JPL
582653	2016 AM_{11}	—	March 10, 2005	Mount Lemmon	Mount Lemmon Survey	MAS	620 m	MPC · JPL
582654	2016 AN_{11}	—	January 25, 2009	Kitt Peak	Spacewatch	NYS	910 m	MPC · JPL
582655	2016 AO_{12}	—	January 29, 2012	Catalina	CSS	ADE	1.9 km	MPC · JPL
582656	2016 AH_{16}	—	July 8, 2014	Haleakala	Pan-STARRS 1	·	630 m	MPC · JPL
582657	2016 AY_{22}	—	December 21, 2008	Mount Lemmon	Mount Lemmon Survey	·	950 m	MPC · JPL
582658	2016 AR_{23}	—	October 11, 2007	Kitt Peak	Spacewatch	·	950 m	MPC · JPL
582659	2016 AE_{26}	—	August 28, 2014	Haleakala	Pan-STARRS 1	V	560 m	MPC · JPL
582660	2016 AY_{27}	—	January 9, 2006	Kitt Peak	Spacewatch	·	610 m	MPC · JPL
582661	2016 AE_{28}	—	November 18, 2011	Mount Lemmon	Mount Lemmon Survey	·	1.1 km	MPC · JPL
582662	2016 AD_{29}	—	February 27, 2009	Kitt Peak	Spacewatch	·	1.1 km	MPC · JPL
582663	2016 AB_{34}	—	November 13, 2015	Mount Lemmon	Mount Lemmon Survey	·	600 m	MPC · JPL
582664	2016 AE_{34}	—	December 28, 2005	Kitt Peak	Spacewatch	·	640 m	MPC · JPL
582665	2016 AG_{35}	—	August 19, 2014	Haleakala	Pan-STARRS 1	·	570 m	MPC · JPL
582666	2016 AU_{37}	—	February 26, 2008	Mount Lemmon	Mount Lemmon Survey	·	940 m	MPC · JPL
582667	2016 AW_{37}	—	January 4, 2016	Haleakala	Pan-STARRS 1	EOS	1.8 km	MPC · JPL
582668	2016 AR_{38}	—	March 26, 2009	Mount Lemmon	Mount Lemmon Survey	·	1.1 km	MPC · JPL
582669	2016 AM_{42}	—	December 10, 2004	Kitt Peak	Spacewatch	MAS	560 m	MPC · JPL
582670	2016 AT_{42}	—	October 24, 2011	Haleakala	Pan-STARRS 1	·	1.1 km	MPC · JPL
582671	2016 AD_{45}	—	March 16, 2009	Kitt Peak	Spacewatch	MAS	640 m	MPC · JPL
582672	2016 AC_{48}	—	November 8, 2007	Kitt Peak	Spacewatch	3:2	4.7 km	MPC · JPL
582673	2016 AD_{50}	—	December 6, 2015	Mount Lemmon	Mount Lemmon Survey	PHO	770 m	MPC · JPL
582674	2016 AT_{53}	—	October 24, 2005	Mauna Kea	A. Boattini	·	810 m	MPC · JPL
582675	2016 AZ_{53}	—	January 25, 2009	Kitt Peak	Spacewatch	NYS	1.1 km	MPC · JPL
582676	2016 AV_{60}	—	January 19, 1994	Kitt Peak	Spacewatch	V	610 m	MPC · JPL
582677	2016 AD_{62}	—	March 15, 2005	Mount Lemmon	Mount Lemmon Survey	·	1.2 km	MPC · JPL
582678	2016 AV_{62}	—	November 1, 2011	Kitt Peak	Spacewatch	·	950 m	MPC · JPL
582679	2016 AR_{63}	—	October 25, 2011	Haleakala	Pan-STARRS 1	·	970 m	MPC · JPL
582680	2016 AZ_{68}	—	December 14, 1998	Kitt Peak	Spacewatch	·	750 m	MPC · JPL
582681	2016 AG_{69}	—	November 18, 2008	Kitt Peak	Spacewatch	·	680 m	MPC · JPL
582682	2016 AQ_{77}	—	October 24, 2005	Mauna Kea	A. Boattini	·	660 m	MPC · JPL
582683	2016 AS_{82}	—	March 13, 2013	Palomar	Palomar Transient Factory	·	900 m	MPC · JPL
582684	2016 AS_{86}	—	November 22, 2015	Mount Lemmon	Mount Lemmon Survey	·	890 m	MPC · JPL
582685	2016 AA_{88}	—	December 21, 2008	Mount Lemmon	Mount Lemmon Survey	·	1.1 km	MPC · JPL
582686	2016 AM_{88}	—	January 27, 2006	Kitt Peak	Spacewatch	V	830 m	MPC · JPL
582687	2016 AB_{93}	—	January 7, 2016	Haleakala	Pan-STARRS 1	·	750 m	MPC · JPL
582688	2016 AJ_{94}	—	November 17, 2001	Socorro	LINEAR	·	660 m	MPC · JPL
582689	2016 AK_{94}	—	December 31, 2007	Catalina	CSS	·	1.8 km	MPC · JPL
582690	2016 AG_{95}	—	June 20, 2006	Mount Lemmon	Mount Lemmon Survey	·	1.2 km	MPC · JPL
582691	2016 AL_{95}	—	April 11, 2005	Mount Lemmon	Mount Lemmon Survey	·	860 m	MPC · JPL
582692	2016 AH_{96}	—	October 18, 2007	Mount Lemmon	Mount Lemmon Survey	MAS	800 m	MPC · JPL
582693	2016 AZ_{96}	—	January 7, 2016	Haleakala	Pan-STARRS 1	·	620 m	MPC · JPL
582694	2016 AF_{97}	—	October 14, 2007	Mount Lemmon	Mount Lemmon Survey	·	990 m	MPC · JPL
582695	2016 AK_{103}	—	November 21, 2003	Kitt Peak	Spacewatch	·	930 m	MPC · JPL
582696	2016 AN_{104}	—	December 31, 2008	Mount Lemmon	Mount Lemmon Survey	·	610 m	MPC · JPL
582697	2016 AZ_{105}	—	March 11, 2005	Mount Lemmon	Mount Lemmon Survey	·	920 m	MPC · JPL
582698	2016 AE_{108}	—	September 28, 2003	Kitt Peak	Spacewatch	·	1.4 km	MPC · JPL
582699	2016 AT_{108}	—	November 12, 2007	Mount Lemmon	Mount Lemmon Survey	·	1.0 km	MPC · JPL
582700	2016 AU_{108}	—	March 29, 2009	Kitt Peak	Spacewatch	V	680 m	MPC · JPL

== 582701–582800 ==
back to top

Designation			Discovery			Properties		Ref
Permanent	Provisional	Named after	Date	Site	Discoverer(s)	Category	Diam.	Ref
582701	2016 AA_{112}	—	July 2, 2005	Kitt Peak	Spacewatch	·	1.6 km	MPC · JPL
582702	2016 AV_{114}	—	May 15, 2013	Haleakala	Pan-STARRS 1	·	1.3 km	MPC · JPL
582703	2016 AT_{115}	—	February 27, 2012	Kitt Peak	Spacewatch	·	1.4 km	MPC · JPL
582704	2016 AZ_{115}	—	March 13, 2012	Mount Lemmon	Mount Lemmon Survey	·	1.1 km	MPC · JPL
582705	2016 AB_{123}	—	September 17, 2014	Haleakala	Pan-STARRS 1	PHO	740 m	MPC · JPL
582706	2016 AH_{123}	—	June 19, 2010	Mount Lemmon	Mount Lemmon Survey	·	1.2 km	MPC · JPL
582707	2016 AR_{123}	—	December 24, 2011	Mount Lemmon	Mount Lemmon Survey	·	860 m	MPC · JPL
582708	2016 AT_{125}	—	January 1, 2012	Mount Lemmon	Mount Lemmon Survey	·	1.1 km	MPC · JPL
582709	2016 AK_{128}	—	January 8, 2016	Haleakala	Pan-STARRS 1	TIR	2.5 km	MPC · JPL
582710	2016 AO_{128}	—	April 18, 2012	Kitt Peak	Spacewatch	JUN	960 m	MPC · JPL
582711	2016 AS_{128}	—	January 8, 2016	Haleakala	Pan-STARRS 1	·	1.2 km	MPC · JPL
582712	2016 AJ_{129}	—	January 8, 2016	Haleakala	Pan-STARRS 1	·	1.3 km	MPC · JPL
582713	2016 AT_{129}	—	October 29, 2014	Haleakala	Pan-STARRS 1	EUN	880 m	MPC · JPL
582714	2016 AF_{130}	—	October 25, 2005	Kitt Peak	Spacewatch	·	1.8 km	MPC · JPL
582715	2016 AE_{137}	—	October 31, 2010	Mount Lemmon	Mount Lemmon Survey	·	1.3 km	MPC · JPL
582716	2016 AR_{141}	—	July 1, 2014	Haleakala	Pan-STARRS 1	·	530 m	MPC · JPL
582717	2016 AB_{143}	—	March 8, 2005	Kitt Peak	Spacewatch	·	1.2 km	MPC · JPL
582718	2016 AL_{160}	—	January 7, 2016	Haleakala	Pan-STARRS 1	·	850 m	MPC · JPL
582719	2016 AS_{162}	—	March 15, 2004	Palomar	NEAT	EUN	1.4 km	MPC · JPL
582720	2016 AL_{164}	—	January 11, 2016	MARGO, Nauchnij	G. Borisov	H	520 m	MPC · JPL
582721	2016 AX_{171}	—	November 24, 2003	Kitt Peak	Spacewatch	·	1.7 km	MPC · JPL
582722	2016 AG_{174}	—	February 28, 2008	Kitt Peak	Spacewatch	EUN	740 m	MPC · JPL
582723	2016 AR_{182}	—	March 25, 2006	Palomar	NEAT	·	880 m	MPC · JPL
582724	2016 AD_{184}	—	May 13, 2009	Kitt Peak	Spacewatch	·	990 m	MPC · JPL
582725	2016 AV_{184}	—	March 4, 2005	Mount Lemmon	Mount Lemmon Survey	MAS	660 m	MPC · JPL
582726	2016 AG_{186}	—	December 13, 2012	Piszkéstető	K. Sárneczky	H	400 m	MPC · JPL
582727	2016 AH_{186}	—	July 28, 2014	Haleakala	Pan-STARRS 1	·	1.3 km	MPC · JPL
582728	2016 AX_{187}	—	February 6, 2005	Bergisch Gladbach	W. Bickel	MAS	550 m	MPC · JPL
582729	2016 AX_{189}	—	April 22, 2013	Mount Lemmon	Mount Lemmon Survey	NYS	1.1 km	MPC · JPL
582730	2016 AN_{190}	—	January 29, 2012	Mount Lemmon	Mount Lemmon Survey	·	1.1 km	MPC · JPL
582731	2016 AY_{190}	—	January 31, 2008	Catalina	CSS	·	1.2 km	MPC · JPL
582732	2016 AX_{195}	—	October 31, 2013	Kitt Peak	Spacewatch	L5	7.4 km	MPC · JPL
582733	2016 AK_{199}	—	January 11, 2016	Haleakala	Pan-STARRS 1	H	440 m	MPC · JPL
582734	2016 AM_{204}	—	January 4, 2016	Haleakala	Pan-STARRS 1	·	600 m	MPC · JPL
582735	2016 AY_{209}	—	January 8, 2016	Haleakala	Pan-STARRS 1	THB	2.5 km	MPC · JPL
582736	2016 AC_{210}	—	August 9, 2013	Haleakala	Pan-STARRS 1	·	1.4 km	MPC · JPL
582737	2016 AY_{210}	—	January 3, 2016	Mount Lemmon	Mount Lemmon Survey	·	3.0 km	MPC · JPL
582738	2016 AB_{212}	—	January 12, 2016	Kitt Peak	Spacewatch	MAR	870 m	MPC · JPL
582739	2016 AV_{215}	—	February 24, 2003	Campo Imperatore	CINEOS	·	1.4 km	MPC · JPL
582740	2016 AW_{215}	—	February 21, 2007	Mount Lemmon	Mount Lemmon Survey	·	1.6 km	MPC · JPL
582741	2016 AY_{215}	—	January 28, 2006	Kitt Peak	Spacewatch	EOS	1.8 km	MPC · JPL
582742	2016 AM_{220}	—	October 26, 2011	Haleakala	Pan-STARRS 1	·	930 m	MPC · JPL
582743	2016 AT_{221}	—	January 24, 2007	Mount Lemmon	Mount Lemmon Survey	·	1.3 km	MPC · JPL
582744	2016 AG_{222}	—	October 13, 2010	Mount Lemmon	Mount Lemmon Survey	·	1.2 km	MPC · JPL
582745	2016 AY_{222}	—	May 15, 2013	Haleakala	Pan-STARRS 1	PHO	660 m	MPC · JPL
582746	2016 AG_{223}	—	January 3, 2016	Haleakala	Pan-STARRS 1	V	510 m	MPC · JPL
582747	2016 AV_{223}	—	May 9, 2013	Haleakala	Pan-STARRS 1	·	820 m	MPC · JPL
582748	2016 AP_{225}	—	March 1, 2012	Mount Lemmon	Mount Lemmon Survey	·	910 m	MPC · JPL
582749	2016 AP_{226}	—	January 8, 2016	Haleakala	Pan-STARRS 1	·	1.1 km	MPC · JPL
582750	2016 AT_{226}	—	July 14, 2013	Haleakala	Pan-STARRS 1	·	1.2 km	MPC · JPL
582751	2016 AA_{227}	—	February 13, 2008	Mount Lemmon	Mount Lemmon Survey	·	1.5 km	MPC · JPL
582752	2016 AB_{232}	—	March 29, 2009	Kitt Peak	Spacewatch	V	550 m	MPC · JPL
582753	2016 AD_{232}	—	March 14, 2012	Kitt Peak	Spacewatch	·	990 m	MPC · JPL
582754	2016 AS_{232}	—	January 31, 2009	Mount Lemmon	Mount Lemmon Survey	·	820 m	MPC · JPL
582755	2016 AB_{234}	—	January 3, 2012	Mount Lemmon	Mount Lemmon Survey	·	1.2 km	MPC · JPL
582756	2016 AN_{235}	—	March 5, 2008	Catalina	CSS	EUN	1.4 km	MPC · JPL
582757	2016 AS_{236}	—	July 28, 2014	Haleakala	Pan-STARRS 1	·	870 m	MPC · JPL
582758	2016 AT_{240}	—	March 3, 2009	Mount Lemmon	Mount Lemmon Survey	·	860 m	MPC · JPL
582759	2016 AY_{242}	—	December 18, 2015	Mount Lemmon	Mount Lemmon Survey	·	3.1 km	MPC · JPL
582760	2016 AZ_{254}	—	August 20, 2014	Haleakala	Pan-STARRS 1	·	910 m	MPC · JPL
582761	2016 AP_{256}	—	December 29, 2011	Kitt Peak	Spacewatch	·	1.0 km	MPC · JPL
582762	2016 AW_{258}	—	January 8, 2016	Haleakala	Pan-STARRS 1	·	1.0 km	MPC · JPL
582763	2016 AW_{259}	—	September 16, 2006	Kitt Peak	Spacewatch	·	780 m	MPC · JPL
582764	2016 AW_{260}	—	March 10, 2008	Kitt Peak	Spacewatch	·	970 m	MPC · JPL
582765	2016 AB_{262}	—	August 12, 2013	Haleakala	Pan-STARRS 1	(194)	1.2 km	MPC · JPL
582766	2016 AD_{265}	—	November 16, 2006	Kitt Peak	Spacewatch	·	1.0 km	MPC · JPL
582767	2016 AF_{266}	—	November 9, 2014	Mount Lemmon	Mount Lemmon Survey	ADE	1.5 km	MPC · JPL
582768	2016 AT_{267}	—	September 19, 2014	Haleakala	Pan-STARRS 1	KON	1.8 km	MPC · JPL
582769	2016 AH_{270}	—	April 14, 2005	Kitt Peak	Spacewatch	·	1.4 km	MPC · JPL
582770	2016 AJ_{272}	—	May 15, 2013	Haleakala	Pan-STARRS 1	PHO	780 m	MPC · JPL
582771	2016 AH_{273}	—	November 11, 2010	Mount Lemmon	Mount Lemmon Survey	·	1.1 km	MPC · JPL
582772	2016 AF_{274}	—	December 1, 2014	Kitt Peak	Spacewatch	·	1.2 km	MPC · JPL
582773	2016 AD_{297}	—	October 2, 2014	Haleakala	Pan-STARRS 1	LUT	2.8 km	MPC · JPL
582774	2016 AS_{301}	—	January 14, 1996	Kitt Peak	Spacewatch	·	1.2 km	MPC · JPL
582775	2016 AU_{305}	—	January 8, 2016	Haleakala	Pan-STARRS 1	·	1.3 km	MPC · JPL
582776	2016 AE_{311}	—	January 13, 2016	Haleakala	Pan-STARRS 1	·	620 m	MPC · JPL
582777	2016 AT_{311}	—	January 9, 2016	Haleakala	Pan-STARRS 1	L5	7.6 km	MPC · JPL
582778	2016 AD_{312}	—	January 8, 2016	Haleakala	Pan-STARRS 1	·	1.0 km	MPC · JPL
582779	2016 AK_{313}	—	January 7, 2016	Haleakala	Pan-STARRS 1	·	1.2 km	MPC · JPL
582780	2016 AV_{315}	—	October 2, 2014	Kitt Peak	Spacewatch	·	1 km	MPC · JPL
582781	2016 AN_{341}	—	January 11, 2016	Haleakala	Pan-STARRS 1	·	1.8 km	MPC · JPL
582782	2016 BA_{4}	—	January 7, 2016	Haleakala	Pan-STARRS 1	·	3.2 km	MPC · JPL
582783	2016 BY_{7}	—	January 9, 2007	Kitt Peak	Spacewatch	·	1.4 km	MPC · JPL
582784	2016 BF_{9}	—	April 27, 2012	Haleakala	Pan-STARRS 1	(1547)	1.3 km	MPC · JPL
582785	2016 BZ_{10}	—	January 8, 2016	Haleakala	Pan-STARRS 1	EUN	870 m	MPC · JPL
582786	2016 BQ_{12}	—	April 21, 2012	Haleakala	Pan-STARRS 1	·	1.2 km	MPC · JPL
582787	2016 BR_{17}	—	August 27, 2014	Haleakala	Pan-STARRS 1	NYS	1.1 km	MPC · JPL
582788	2016 BQ_{21}	—	February 26, 2011	Mount Lemmon	Mount Lemmon Survey	·	2.2 km	MPC · JPL
582789	2016 BT_{23}	—	February 2, 2005	Kitt Peak	Spacewatch	NYS	870 m	MPC · JPL
582790	2016 BX_{23}	—	December 4, 2007	Kitt Peak	Spacewatch	·	1.3 km	MPC · JPL
582791	2016 BQ_{25}	—	February 18, 2005	La Silla	A. Boattini	·	1.2 km	MPC · JPL
582792	2016 BZ_{27}	—	July 8, 2013	Haleakala	Pan-STARRS 1	BRG	1.4 km	MPC · JPL
582793	2016 BC_{29}	—	October 9, 2007	Mount Lemmon	Mount Lemmon Survey	·	870 m	MPC · JPL
582794	2016 BP_{29}	—	February 23, 2012	Mount Lemmon	Mount Lemmon Survey	·	1.3 km	MPC · JPL
582795	2016 BS_{33}	—	March 10, 2005	Mount Lemmon	Mount Lemmon Survey	·	810 m	MPC · JPL
582796	2016 BY_{35}	—	October 21, 2006	Mount Lemmon	Mount Lemmon Survey	·	1.2 km	MPC · JPL
582797	2016 BG_{36}	—	March 9, 2002	Palomar	NEAT	·	970 m	MPC · JPL
582798	2016 BC_{38}	—	September 25, 1998	Kitt Peak	Spacewatch	·	1.3 km	MPC · JPL
582799	2016 BZ_{42}	—	March 1, 2008	Kitt Peak	Spacewatch	·	960 m	MPC · JPL
582800	2016 BD_{50}	—	October 26, 2011	Haleakala	Pan-STARRS 1	·	1.0 km	MPC · JPL

== 582801–582900 ==
back to top

Designation			Discovery			Properties		Ref
Permanent	Provisional	Named after	Date	Site	Discoverer(s)	Category	Diam.	Ref
582801	2016 BJ_{52}	—	October 7, 2005	Mauna Kea	A. Boattini	·	590 m	MPC · JPL
582802	2016 BL_{52}	—	December 5, 2007	Kitt Peak	Spacewatch	·	1.3 km	MPC · JPL
582803	2016 BW_{56}	—	October 26, 2011	Haleakala	Pan-STARRS 1	V	500 m	MPC · JPL
582804	2016 BE_{60}	—	April 12, 2013	Haleakala	Pan-STARRS 1	V	540 m	MPC · JPL
582805	2016 BP_{61}	—	November 28, 2011	Kitt Peak	Spacewatch	·	1.1 km	MPC · JPL
582806	2016 BL_{66}	—	August 9, 2007	Kitt Peak	Spacewatch	·	830 m	MPC · JPL
582807	2016 BE_{69}	—	April 6, 2008	Kitt Peak	Spacewatch	·	1.0 km	MPC · JPL
582808	2016 BC_{72}	—	March 10, 2008	Kitt Peak	Spacewatch	·	910 m	MPC · JPL
582809	2016 BZ_{76}	—	January 14, 2016	Haleakala	Pan-STARRS 1	·	1.2 km	MPC · JPL
582810	2016 BF_{78}	—	August 21, 2004	Mauna Kea	D. D. Balam	·	530 m	MPC · JPL
582811	2016 BY_{84}	—	January 17, 2016	Haleakala	Pan-STARRS 1	·	2.7 km	MPC · JPL
582812	2016 BR_{85}	—	January 18, 2016	Haleakala	Pan-STARRS 1	·	940 m	MPC · JPL
582813	2016 BX_{86}	—	April 13, 2008	Mount Lemmon	Mount Lemmon Survey	·	940 m	MPC · JPL
582814	2016 BC_{88}	—	March 18, 2009	Kitt Peak	Spacewatch	NYS	1.1 km	MPC · JPL
582815	2016 BK_{88}	—	November 29, 2014	Mount Lemmon	Mount Lemmon Survey	·	1.5 km	MPC · JPL
582816	2016 BA_{91}	—	July 1, 2008	Kitt Peak	Spacewatch	JUN	1.2 km	MPC · JPL
582817	2016 BJ_{91}	—	January 28, 2011	Mount Lemmon	Mount Lemmon Survey	HNS	1.0 km	MPC · JPL
582818	2016 BZ_{92}	—	January 18, 2016	Haleakala	Pan-STARRS 1	·	1.7 km	MPC · JPL
582819	2016 BW_{93}	—	March 29, 2008	Kitt Peak	Spacewatch	·	1.7 km	MPC · JPL
582820	2016 BC_{94}	—	April 28, 2009	Mount Lemmon	Mount Lemmon Survey	·	930 m	MPC · JPL
582821	2016 BP_{95}	—	November 13, 2010	Mount Lemmon	Mount Lemmon Survey	·	1.3 km	MPC · JPL
582822	2016 BO_{97}	—	August 8, 2013	Haleakala	Pan-STARRS 1	·	1.4 km	MPC · JPL
582823	2016 BP_{97}	—	September 2, 2010	Mount Lemmon	Mount Lemmon Survey	·	1.2 km	MPC · JPL
582824	2016 BM_{99}	—	March 31, 2003	Apache Point	SDSS Collaboration	·	1.3 km	MPC · JPL
582825	2016 BS_{99}	—	January 26, 2011	Mount Lemmon	Mount Lemmon Survey	·	1.4 km	MPC · JPL
582826	2016 BZ_{99}	—	March 25, 2012	Mount Lemmon	Mount Lemmon Survey	EUN	880 m	MPC · JPL
582827	2016 BQ_{100}	—	November 2, 2010	Kitt Peak	Spacewatch	·	1.3 km	MPC · JPL
582828	2016 BZ_{101}	—	January 18, 2016	Haleakala	Pan-STARRS 1	EUN	930 m	MPC · JPL
582829	2016 BD_{114}	—	January 16, 2016	Haleakala	Pan-STARRS 1	·	1.2 km	MPC · JPL
582830	2016 BG_{114}	—	March 29, 2012	Kitt Peak	Spacewatch	·	960 m	MPC · JPL
582831	2016 BA_{118}	—	January 19, 2016	Mount Lemmon	Mount Lemmon Survey	V	430 m	MPC · JPL
582832	2016 CR_{2}	—	March 3, 2008	XuYi	PMO NEO Survey Program	·	840 m	MPC · JPL
582833	2016 CT_{2}	—	January 4, 2016	Haleakala	Pan-STARRS 1	·	520 m	MPC · JPL
582834	2016 CO_{5}	—	February 3, 2012	Haleakala	Pan-STARRS 1	·	760 m	MPC · JPL
582835	2016 CS_{8}	—	March 17, 2009	Kitt Peak	Spacewatch	·	1 km	MPC · JPL
582836	2016 CD_{10}	—	February 12, 2004	Kitt Peak	Spacewatch	·	820 m	MPC · JPL
582837	2016 CO_{10}	—	February 1, 2009	Kitt Peak	Spacewatch	·	660 m	MPC · JPL
582838	2016 CU_{10}	—	August 28, 2014	Haleakala	Pan-STARRS 1	·	800 m	MPC · JPL
582839	2016 CF_{13}	—	January 20, 2009	Mount Lemmon	Mount Lemmon Survey	·	530 m	MPC · JPL
582840	2016 CO_{13}	—	October 19, 2003	Apache Point	SDSS Collaboration	·	1.4 km	MPC · JPL
582841	2016 CL_{15}	—	February 2, 2008	Kitt Peak	Spacewatch	·	910 m	MPC · JPL
582842	2016 CH_{20}	—	February 1, 2009	Mount Lemmon	Mount Lemmon Survey	V	610 m	MPC · JPL
582843	2016 CO_{20}	—	January 4, 2016	Haleakala	Pan-STARRS 1	·	1.3 km	MPC · JPL
582844	2016 CM_{21}	—	July 12, 2007	La Sagra	OAM	·	790 m	MPC · JPL
582845	2016 CM_{24}	—	November 17, 2008	Kitt Peak	Spacewatch	·	510 m	MPC · JPL
582846	2016 CX_{24}	—	December 13, 2006	Kitt Peak	Spacewatch	JUN	780 m	MPC · JPL
582847	2016 CO_{33}	—	February 27, 2009	Mount Lemmon	Mount Lemmon Survey	·	1.1 km	MPC · JPL
582848	2016 CP_{33}	—	September 2, 2014	Mount Lemmon	Mount Lemmon Survey	·	940 m	MPC · JPL
582849	2016 CC_{34}	—	August 31, 2014	Mount Lemmon	Mount Lemmon Survey	·	1.0 km	MPC · JPL
582850	2016 CS_{36}	—	October 22, 2003	Apache Point	SDSS Collaboration	·	1.1 km	MPC · JPL
582851	2016 CM_{37}	—	April 11, 2005	Mount Lemmon	Mount Lemmon Survey	·	1.1 km	MPC · JPL
582852	2016 CQ_{37}	—	June 28, 2006	Siding Spring	SSS	T_{j} (2.98)	3.3 km	MPC · JPL
582853	2016 CW_{39}	—	March 28, 2009	Kitt Peak	Spacewatch	·	1.2 km	MPC · JPL
582854	2016 CR_{40}	—	November 25, 2011	Haleakala	Pan-STARRS 1	MAS	700 m	MPC · JPL
582855	2016 CW_{41}	—	August 15, 2014	Haleakala	Pan-STARRS 1	V	480 m	MPC · JPL
582856	2016 CO_{42}	—	April 30, 2009	Kitt Peak	Spacewatch	SUL	1.4 km	MPC · JPL
582857	2016 CZ_{49}	—	July 25, 2014	Haleakala	Pan-STARRS 1	·	600 m	MPC · JPL
582858	2016 CM_{50}	—	March 20, 1999	Apache Point	SDSS Collaboration	V	650 m	MPC · JPL
582859	2016 CQ_{52}	—	December 29, 2011	Kitt Peak	Spacewatch	·	910 m	MPC · JPL
582860	2016 CL_{56}	—	January 18, 2012	Mount Lemmon	Mount Lemmon Survey	·	1.2 km	MPC · JPL
582861	2016 CO_{56}	—	April 19, 2009	Mount Lemmon	Mount Lemmon Survey	·	1.2 km	MPC · JPL
582862	2016 CY_{59}	—	February 3, 2016	Haleakala	Pan-STARRS 1	PHO	900 m	MPC · JPL
582863	2016 CP_{61}	—	May 10, 2004	Catalina	CSS	RAF	1.1 km	MPC · JPL
582864	2016 CW_{62}	—	November 18, 2014	Mount Lemmon	Mount Lemmon Survey	·	1.1 km	MPC · JPL
582865	2016 CD_{70}	—	January 16, 2016	Mount Lemmon	Mount Lemmon Survey	·	1.9 km	MPC · JPL
582866	2016 CZ_{72}	—	February 4, 2016	Haleakala	Pan-STARRS 1	·	980 m	MPC · JPL
582867	2016 CJ_{78}	—	December 20, 2004	Mount Lemmon	Mount Lemmon Survey	·	1.2 km	MPC · JPL
582868	2016 CM_{86}	—	February 1, 2012	Mount Lemmon	Mount Lemmon Survey	·	1.2 km	MPC · JPL
582869	2016 CY_{87}	—	March 29, 2008	Catalina	CSS	(5)	1.3 km	MPC · JPL
582870	2016 CT_{88}	—	March 14, 2012	Haleakala	Pan-STARRS 1	EUN	870 m	MPC · JPL
582871	2016 CR_{96}	—	May 2, 2009	Cerro Burek	Burek, Cerro	·	1.1 km	MPC · JPL
582872	2016 CJ_{97}	—	November 17, 2011	Mount Lemmon	Mount Lemmon Survey	·	730 m	MPC · JPL
582873	2016 CK_{99}	—	January 4, 2016	Haleakala	Pan-STARRS 1	PHO	750 m	MPC · JPL
582874	2016 CP_{100}	—	January 4, 2016	Haleakala	Pan-STARRS 1	·	1.0 km	MPC · JPL
582875	2016 CT_{100}	—	July 5, 2005	Kitt Peak	Spacewatch	·	1.1 km	MPC · JPL
582876	2016 CU_{102}	—	May 20, 2012	Mount Lemmon	Mount Lemmon Survey	·	2.6 km	MPC · JPL
582877	2016 CZ_{105}	—	November 25, 2011	Haleakala	Pan-STARRS 1	·	750 m	MPC · JPL
582878	2016 CM_{107}	—	October 13, 2010	Mount Lemmon	Mount Lemmon Survey	·	1.1 km	MPC · JPL
582879	2016 CK_{112}	—	November 16, 2003	Kitt Peak	Spacewatch	·	1.0 km	MPC · JPL
582880	2016 CP_{112}	—	March 9, 2005	Kitt Peak	Spacewatch	·	1.3 km	MPC · JPL
582881	2016 CW_{112}	—	December 13, 2015	Haleakala	Pan-STARRS 1	·	3.3 km	MPC · JPL
582882	2016 CM_{114}	—	January 19, 2012	Haleakala	Pan-STARRS 1	·	720 m	MPC · JPL
582883	2016 CL_{115}	—	September 28, 2014	Haleakala	Pan-STARRS 1	·	1.1 km	MPC · JPL
582884	2016 CX_{116}	—	February 5, 2016	Haleakala	Pan-STARRS 1	·	500 m	MPC · JPL
582885	2016 CZ_{116}	—	September 27, 2003	Kitt Peak	Spacewatch	V	550 m	MPC · JPL
582886	2016 CV_{117}	—	April 1, 2008	Mount Lemmon	Mount Lemmon Survey	·	910 m	MPC · JPL
582887	2016 CP_{119}	—	September 4, 2010	Mount Lemmon	Mount Lemmon Survey	·	1.0 km	MPC · JPL
582888	2016 CX_{121}	—	August 16, 2001	Palomar	NEAT	·	1.0 km	MPC · JPL
582889	2016 CH_{129}	—	March 16, 2008	Kitt Peak	Spacewatch	·	920 m	MPC · JPL
582890	2016 CU_{131}	—	June 5, 2005	Kitt Peak	Spacewatch	·	1.4 km	MPC · JPL
582891	2016 CO_{139}	—	October 15, 2001	Palomar	NEAT	·	730 m	MPC · JPL
582892	2016 CD_{140}	—	March 27, 2009	Mount Lemmon	Mount Lemmon Survey	·	1.3 km	MPC · JPL
582893	2016 CU_{145}	—	February 29, 2012	Mount Lemmon	Mount Lemmon Survey	·	1 km	MPC · JPL
582894	2016 CW_{147}	—	January 2, 2012	Mount Lemmon	Mount Lemmon Survey	V	520 m	MPC · JPL
582895	2016 CZ_{149}	—	November 22, 2011	Mount Lemmon	Mount Lemmon Survey	NYS	920 m	MPC · JPL
582896	2016 CL_{160}	—	March 13, 2005	Kitt Peak	Spacewatch	MAS	660 m	MPC · JPL
582897	2016 CP_{160}	—	August 20, 2014	Haleakala	Pan-STARRS 1	·	870 m	MPC · JPL
582898	2016 CJ_{161}	—	December 21, 2006	Kitt Peak	L. H. Wasserman, M. W. Buie	·	550 m	MPC · JPL
582899	2016 CL_{164}	—	March 29, 2009	Kitt Peak	Spacewatch	·	1.0 km	MPC · JPL
582900	2016 CP_{165}	—	January 3, 2016	Haleakala	Pan-STARRS 1	·	620 m	MPC · JPL

== 582901–583000 ==
back to top

Designation			Discovery			Properties		Ref
Permanent	Provisional	Named after	Date	Site	Discoverer(s)	Category	Diam.	Ref
582901	2016 CZ_{166}	—	December 27, 2011	Kitt Peak	Spacewatch	·	1.2 km	MPC · JPL
582902	2016 CK_{167}	—	December 30, 2011	Mount Lemmon	Mount Lemmon Survey	·	1.1 km	MPC · JPL
582903	2016 CB_{174}	—	January 8, 2016	Haleakala	Pan-STARRS 1	NYS	980 m	MPC · JPL
582904	2016 CX_{174}	—	July 31, 2014	Haleakala	Pan-STARRS 1	·	1.1 km	MPC · JPL
582905	2016 CL_{181}	—	September 1, 2014	Mount Lemmon	Mount Lemmon Survey	·	1.2 km	MPC · JPL
582906	2016 CB_{182}	—	November 13, 2007	Kitt Peak	Spacewatch	·	1.1 km	MPC · JPL
582907	2016 CF_{182}	—	December 9, 2015	Haleakala	Pan-STARRS 1	·	1.7 km	MPC · JPL
582908	2016 CT_{183}	—	April 15, 2005	Kitt Peak	Spacewatch	·	1.1 km	MPC · JPL
582909	2016 CR_{184}	—	January 4, 2016	Haleakala	Pan-STARRS 1	·	1.2 km	MPC · JPL
582910 Tormazsófia	2016 CC_{185}	Tormazsófia	November 17, 2011	Piszkéstető	K. Sárneczky, A. Farkas	·	1.2 km	MPC · JPL
582911	2016 CG_{185}	—	February 24, 2012	Haleakala	Pan-STARRS 1	EUN	1 km	MPC · JPL
582912	2016 CS_{189}	—	September 24, 2011	Mount Lemmon	Mount Lemmon Survey	·	670 m	MPC · JPL
582913	2016 CS_{193}	—	June 7, 2012	Haleakala	Pan-STARRS 1	·	1.2 km	MPC · JPL
582914	2016 CX_{195}	—	October 14, 2007	Mount Lemmon	Mount Lemmon Survey	·	890 m	MPC · JPL
582915	2016 CO_{196}	—	February 28, 2012	Haleakala	Pan-STARRS 1	·	1.2 km	MPC · JPL
582916	2016 CP_{196}	—	January 16, 2005	Mauna Kea	Veillet, C.	MAS	660 m	MPC · JPL
582917	2016 CN_{197}	—	August 28, 2005	Anderson Mesa	LONEOS	·	1.2 km	MPC · JPL
582918	2016 CR_{197}	—	March 13, 2008	Kitt Peak	Spacewatch	·	760 m	MPC · JPL
582919	2016 CP_{200}	—	March 28, 2001	Kitt Peak	Spacewatch	MAS	710 m	MPC · JPL
582920	2016 CT_{201}	—	January 29, 2003	Apache Point	SDSS Collaboration	·	3.7 km	MPC · JPL
582921	2016 CL_{202}	—	September 14, 2006	Mauna Kea	Masiero, J., R. Jedicke	·	980 m	MPC · JPL
582922	2016 CS_{202}	—	February 9, 2016	Haleakala	Pan-STARRS 1	·	940 m	MPC · JPL
582923	2016 CL_{211}	—	March 26, 2008	Mount Lemmon	Mount Lemmon Survey	·	730 m	MPC · JPL
582924	2016 CU_{211}	—	August 30, 2014	Catalina	CSS	PHO	1.1 km	MPC · JPL
582925	2016 CJ_{213}	—	August 23, 2014	Haleakala	Pan-STARRS 1	·	1.1 km	MPC · JPL
582926	2016 CD_{215}	—	August 19, 2001	Cerro Tololo	Deep Ecliptic Survey	·	850 m	MPC · JPL
582927	2016 CB_{216}	—	January 18, 2008	Kitt Peak	Spacewatch	·	970 m	MPC · JPL
582928 Smriglio	2016 CA_{217}	Smriglio	February 23, 2012	Mount Graham	K. Černis, R. P. Boyle	·	950 m	MPC · JPL
582929	2016 CT_{218}	—	February 1, 2012	Kitt Peak	Spacewatch	·	1.3 km	MPC · JPL
582930	2016 CT_{219}	—	September 2, 2014	Haleakala	Pan-STARRS 1	·	1.1 km	MPC · JPL
582931	2016 CR_{220}	—	February 13, 2008	Mount Lemmon	Mount Lemmon Survey	·	1.1 km	MPC · JPL
582932	2016 CL_{230}	—	March 27, 2008	Mount Lemmon	Mount Lemmon Survey	EUN	1 km	MPC · JPL
582933	2016 CE_{238}	—	June 7, 2013	Oukaïmeden	M. Ory	MAR	890 m	MPC · JPL
582934	2016 CA_{246}	—	April 17, 2012	Kitt Peak	Spacewatch	·	1.2 km	MPC · JPL
582935	2016 CJ_{246}	—	February 11, 1999	Socorro	LINEAR	·	1.5 km	MPC · JPL
582936	2016 CJ_{249}	—	June 24, 2005	Palomar	NEAT	NYS	1.3 km	MPC · JPL
582937	2016 CP_{258}	—	April 7, 2003	Socorro	LINEAR	(1547)	1.6 km	MPC · JPL
582938	2016 CY_{258}	—	April 25, 2012	Mount Lemmon	Mount Lemmon Survey	·	2.0 km	MPC · JPL
582939	2016 CZ_{258}	—	February 11, 2016	Haleakala	Pan-STARRS 1	·	1.7 km	MPC · JPL
582940	2016 CQ_{259}	—	January 29, 1995	Kitt Peak	Spacewatch	·	1.3 km	MPC · JPL
582941	2016 CL_{260}	—	February 11, 2016	Haleakala	Pan-STARRS 1	BRG	1.3 km	MPC · JPL
582942	2016 CM_{260}	—	February 1, 2012	Mount Lemmon	Mount Lemmon Survey	·	740 m	MPC · JPL
582943	2016 CR_{260}	—	September 25, 2008	Mount Lemmon	Mount Lemmon Survey	·	1.8 km	MPC · JPL
582944	2016 CZ_{260}	—	December 14, 2010	Mount Lemmon	Mount Lemmon Survey	·	1.3 km	MPC · JPL
582945	2016 CK_{261}	—	November 13, 2010	Kitt Peak	Spacewatch	·	1.3 km	MPC · JPL
582946	2016 CA_{263}	—	January 9, 2016	Haleakala	Pan-STARRS 1	·	1.2 km	MPC · JPL
582947	2016 CC_{263}	—	January 16, 2016	Haleakala	Pan-STARRS 1	EUN	960 m	MPC · JPL
582948	2016 CE_{263}	—	December 9, 2010	Mount Lemmon	Mount Lemmon Survey	·	1.3 km	MPC · JPL
582949	2016 CM_{263}	—	January 14, 1994	Kitt Peak	Spacewatch	ADE	1.8 km	MPC · JPL
582950	2016 CR_{265}	—	August 30, 2014	Haleakala	Pan-STARRS 1	H	430 m	MPC · JPL
582951	2016 CP_{267}	—	February 12, 2016	Haleakala	Pan-STARRS 1	H	360 m	MPC · JPL
582952	2016 CB_{270}	—	February 4, 2016	Haleakala	Pan-STARRS 1	·	990 m	MPC · JPL
582953	2016 CL_{270}	—	November 27, 2006	Mount Lemmon	Mount Lemmon Survey	·	1.2 km	MPC · JPL
582954	2016 CH_{277}	—	March 10, 2003	Palomar	NEAT	BAR	1.1 km	MPC · JPL
582955	2016 CM_{277}	—	February 10, 2011	Mount Lemmon	Mount Lemmon Survey	·	1.5 km	MPC · JPL
582956	2016 CR_{277}	—	September 26, 2014	Mount Lemmon	Mount Lemmon Survey	·	2.0 km	MPC · JPL
582957	2016 CG_{281}	—	April 20, 2012	Kitt Peak	Spacewatch	EUN	950 m	MPC · JPL
582958	2016 CB_{282}	—	February 11, 2016	Haleakala	Pan-STARRS 1	·	1.0 km	MPC · JPL
582959	2016 CD_{282}	—	July 26, 2008	Siding Spring	SSS	·	1.9 km	MPC · JPL
582960	2016 CV_{284}	—	February 11, 2008	Mount Lemmon	Mount Lemmon Survey	·	790 m	MPC · JPL
582961	2016 CC_{285}	—	March 5, 2012	Kitt Peak	Spacewatch	·	980 m	MPC · JPL
582962	2016 CN_{285}	—	March 15, 2008	Mount Lemmon	Mount Lemmon Survey	·	990 m	MPC · JPL
582963	2016 CQ_{285}	—	February 2, 2008	Mount Lemmon	Mount Lemmon Survey	·	1.2 km	MPC · JPL
582964	2016 CB_{286}	—	February 11, 2016	Haleakala	Pan-STARRS 1	RAF	710 m	MPC · JPL
582965	2016 CB_{289}	—	February 7, 2002	Palomar	NEAT	·	1.6 km	MPC · JPL
582966	2016 CJ_{289}	—	April 20, 2009	Mount Lemmon	Mount Lemmon Survey	·	1.3 km	MPC · JPL
582967	2016 CG_{290}	—	September 10, 2013	Haleakala	Pan-STARRS 1	·	1.7 km	MPC · JPL
582968	2016 CW_{290}	—	August 14, 2013	Haleakala	Pan-STARRS 1	EUN	950 m	MPC · JPL
582969	2016 CD_{291}	—	October 16, 2003	Kitt Peak	Spacewatch	MAS	660 m	MPC · JPL
582970	2016 CG_{292}	—	November 3, 2010	Mount Lemmon	Mount Lemmon Survey	·	810 m	MPC · JPL
582971	2016 CW_{294}	—	July 25, 2012	Sandlot	G. Hug	·	2.0 km	MPC · JPL
582972	2016 CZ_{295}	—	February 16, 2012	Mayhill-ISON	L. Elenin	·	1.4 km	MPC · JPL
582973	2016 CU_{298}	—	February 4, 2016	Haleakala	Pan-STARRS 1	·	780 m	MPC · JPL
582974	2016 CZ_{301}	—	March 15, 2012	Mount Lemmon	Mount Lemmon Survey	·	760 m	MPC · JPL
582975	2016 CC_{302}	—	February 27, 2012	Haleakala	Pan-STARRS 1	·	840 m	MPC · JPL
582976	2016 CK_{302}	—	February 29, 2008	Kitt Peak	Spacewatch	·	1.1 km	MPC · JPL
582977	2016 CT_{304}	—	September 21, 2001	Apache Point	SDSS Collaboration	·	1.2 km	MPC · JPL
582978	2016 CU_{304}	—	April 29, 2003	Kitt Peak	Spacewatch	·	1.6 km	MPC · JPL
582979	2016 CY_{304}	—	February 5, 2016	Haleakala	Pan-STARRS 1	·	1.4 km	MPC · JPL
582980	2016 CJ_{305}	—	January 27, 2011	Mount Lemmon	Mount Lemmon Survey	·	1.3 km	MPC · JPL
582981	2016 CL_{305}	—	December 13, 2010	Mount Lemmon	Mount Lemmon Survey	EUN	1 km	MPC · JPL
582982	2016 CK_{307}	—	August 12, 2013	Haleakala	Pan-STARRS 1	·	1.1 km	MPC · JPL
582983	2016 CJ_{311}	—	February 21, 2007	Kitt Peak	Spacewatch	JUN	640 m	MPC · JPL
582984	2016 CU_{311}	—	November 27, 2014	Haleakala	Pan-STARRS 1	·	1.2 km	MPC · JPL
582985	2016 CX_{312}	—	February 25, 2012	Kitt Peak	Spacewatch	·	860 m	MPC · JPL
582986	2016 CJ_{314}	—	October 3, 2013	Haleakala	Pan-STARRS 1	·	1.3 km	MPC · JPL
582987	2016 CS_{314}	—	February 21, 2003	Palomar	NEAT	·	1.8 km	MPC · JPL
582988	2016 CT_{314}	—	November 21, 2014	Mount Lemmon	Mount Lemmon Survey	BRG	1.1 km	MPC · JPL
582989	2016 CZ_{314}	—	December 29, 2014	Haleakala	Pan-STARRS 1	·	1.3 km	MPC · JPL
582990	2016 CT_{318}	—	April 14, 2008	Kitt Peak	Spacewatch	·	910 m	MPC · JPL
582991	2016 CZ_{318}	—	January 4, 2011	Mount Lemmon	Mount Lemmon Survey	·	1.4 km	MPC · JPL
582992	2016 CK_{319}	—	February 10, 2011	Mount Lemmon	Mount Lemmon Survey	·	1.5 km	MPC · JPL
582993	2016 CY_{319}	—	February 9, 2015	Mount Lemmon	Mount Lemmon Survey	·	1.7 km	MPC · JPL
582994	2016 CW_{320}	—	December 27, 2014	Haleakala	Pan-STARRS 1	·	1.7 km	MPC · JPL
582995	2016 CO_{321}	—	August 15, 2013	Haleakala	Pan-STARRS 1	EUN	1.0 km	MPC · JPL
582996	2016 CS_{321}	—	December 10, 2010	Mount Lemmon	Mount Lemmon Survey	·	1.4 km	MPC · JPL
582997	2016 CK_{322}	—	August 12, 2013	Haleakala	Pan-STARRS 1	·	1.4 km	MPC · JPL
582998	2016 CT_{322}	—	June 20, 2012	ESA OGS	ESA OGS	EUN	1.2 km	MPC · JPL
582999	2016 CY_{323}	—	February 11, 2016	Haleakala	Pan-STARRS 1	·	1.8 km	MPC · JPL
583000	2016 CR_{325}	—	February 11, 2016	Haleakala	Pan-STARRS 1	·	1.2 km	MPC · JPL

back to top

== Meaning of names ==
As minor planet discoveries are confirmed, they are given a permanent number by the IAU's Minor Planet Center (MPC), and the discoverers can then submit names for them, following the IAU's naming conventions. The list below concerns those minor planets in the specified number-range that have received names, and explains the meanings of those names.

Official naming citations of newly named small Solar System bodies are approved and published in a bulletin by IAU's Working Group for Small Bodies Nomenclature (WGSBN). Before May 2021, citations were published in MPC's Minor Planet Circulars for many decades. Recent citations can also be found on the JPL Small-Body Database (SBDB). Until his death in 2016, German astronomer Lutz D. Schmadel compiled these citations into the Dictionary of Minor Planet Names (DMP) and regularly updated the collection.

Based on Paul Herget's The Names of the Minor Planets, Schmadel also researched the unclear origin of numerous asteroids, most of which had been named prior to World War II. This article incorporates text from this source, which is in the public domain: SBDB New namings may only be added to this list below after official publication as the preannouncement of names is condemned. The WGSBN publishes a comprehensive guideline for the naming rules of non-cometary small Solar System bodies.

Named minor planet	Provisional	This minor planet was named for...	Ref · Catalog
582910 Tormazsófia	2016 CC_{185}	Zsófia Torma (1832–1899), the first Hungarian female archaeologist and anthropologist and an explorer.	IAU · 582910
582928 Smriglio	2016 CA_{217}	Filippo Smriglio (born 1936), an Italian astronomer and Director of the Astrophysical Station of Campo Imperatore.	IAU · 582928
