= C/2014 Q3 (Borisov) =

Halley-type comet

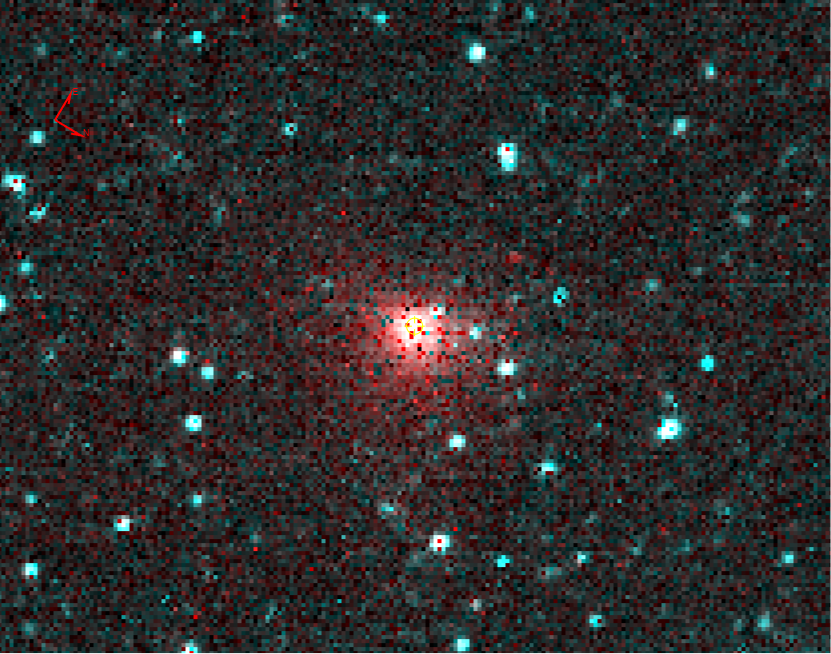
- Comet Borisov photographed by NEOWISE on 27 November 2014

Discovery
- Discovered by: Gennadiy Borisov
- Discovery site: MARGO, Ukraine (L51)
- Discovery date: 22 August 2014

Orbital characteristics
- Epoch: 19 October 2014 (JD 2456949.5)
- Observation arc: 189 days
- Number of observations: 766
- Aphelion: 55.222 AU
- Perihelion: 1.647 AU
- Semi-major axis: 28.434 AU
- Eccentricity: 0.94196
- Orbital period: 148 years (inbound); 146 years (outbound)
- Inclination: 89.949°
- Longitude of ascending node: 63.129°
- Argument of periapsis: 47.381°
- Mean anomaly: 359.79°
- Last perihelion: 19 November 2014
- Next perihelion: ~2160
- T_{Jupiter}: 0.184
- Earth MOID: 0.866 AU
- Jupiter MOID: 1.354 AU

Physical characteristics
- Mean radius: 0.955 km (0.593 mi)
- Comet total magnitude (M1): 8.8
- Comet nuclear magnitude (M2): 15.2

C/2014 Q3 (Borisov) is a Halley-type comet discovered at apparent magnitude 17 on 22 August 2014 by amateur astronomer Gennadiy Borisov using a 0.3 m (12 in) astrograph. It is the third comet discovered by Borisov. The comet was best viewed from the northern hemisphere.

The comet was expected to reach about magnitude ~11 near perihelion (closest approach to the Sun), but brightened to around magnitude 10. By 8 November 2014, the comet had a declination of +83 and was circumpolar from the northern hemisphere. The comet came to perihelion on 19 November 2014 at a distance of 1.65 AU (247 million km) from the Sun.

== Orbit ==
Before entering the planetary region (epoch 1950), C/2014 Q3 had an orbital period of 148 years. After leaving the planetary region (epoch 2050), it has an orbital period of 146 years.
