= C/2013 N4 (Borisov) =

Long-period comet

Discovery
- Discovered by: Gennadiy Borisov
- Discovery site: Crimea, Ukraine
- Discovery date: 8 July 2013

Orbital characteristics
- Epoch: 15 September 2013 (JD 2456550.5)
- Observation arc: 296 days
- Number of observations: 287
- Aphelion: 94.864 AU
- Perihelion: 1.210 AU
- Semi-major axis: 48.037 AU
- Eccentricity: 0.97480
- Orbital period: 332.95 years
- Inclination: 37.035°
- Longitude of ascending node: 322.61°
- Argument of periapsis: 142.28°
- Mean anomaly: 0.072°
- Last perihelion: 21 August 2013
- Next perihelion: ~2340s
- T_{Jupiter}: 1.190
- Earth MOID: 0.320 AU
- Jupiter MOID: 1.099 AU

Physical characteristics
- Mean radius: 2.64 km (1.64 mi)
- Comet total magnitude (M1): 12.1

C/2013 N4 (Borisov) is a long-period comet that was observed between July 2013 and April 2014. It was the first comet ever discovered by Ukrainian astronomer, Gennadiy Borisov.

== Observational history ==
During a joint Russian–Ukrainian star party held on Crimea on 8 July 2013, Gennadiy Borisov discovered a new comet using his 8 in (20 cm) telescope, which at the time it was a 17th-magnitude object near the star Capella. Follow-up observations conducted by Artyom Novichonok, Alan Hale, and others confirmed the existence of this comet, later announcing Borisov's discovery on 13 July 2013.

While it was about 2.59 AU (387 million km) from the Sun in February 2014, the NEOWISE telescope observed the comet in infrared light, where it determined that it emitted carbon dioxide gas at a rate of (3.01±0.17)×10^{26} molecules/s^{−1}.
