= Gennadiy Borisov =

Amateur astronomer who discovered the first known interstellar comet

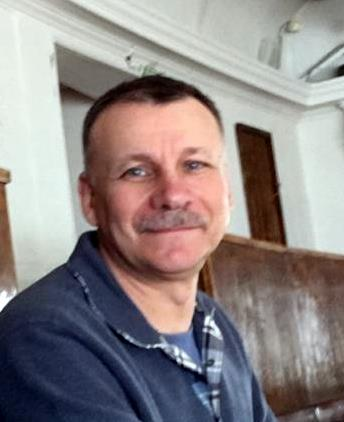
- Born: Gennadiy Vladimirovich Borisov; 1962 (age 63–64); Kramatorsk, USSR
- Occupations: Telescope maker; Amateur astronomer
- Employer: Sternberg Astronomical Institute
- Known for: Discovery of 2I/Borisov
- Awards: multiple Edgar Wilson Awards
- MARGO observatory
- Observatory code: L51
- Location: Nauchnyi, Bakhchysarai Raion, Crimea
- Coordinates: 44°43′35″N 34°0′45″E
- Altitude: 574 m (1,883 ft)
- Established: 2013

Telescopes
- GENON: 0.192 m (f/1.54)
- GENON: 0.192 m (f/1.54)
- GENON Max: 0.300 m (f/1.5)
- GENON Max: 0.300 m (f/1.5)
- HGB-650: 0.650 m (f/1.5)

Gennadiy Vladimirovich Borisov (Russian: Генна́дий Влади́мирович Бори́сов; born 1962 in Kramatorsk) is a Crimean telescope maker and amateur astronomer who discovered the first-known interstellar comet, 2I/Borisov, in 2019.

== Work ==
Borisov works as an engineer at the Crimean Astronomical Station (Note: Not to be confused with the Crimean Astrophysical Observatory, which is located right next to it.) of the Sternberg Astronomical Institute of Moscow State University. There, he maintains the telescopes, but does not make observations himself. He also works with Astronomicheskiy Nauchnyy Tsentr JSC, creating experimental telescopes in collaboration with Roscosmos.

Comets discovered by Gennadiy Borisov
Designation	Type
C/2013 N4 (Borisov)	long-period
C/2013 V2 (Borisov)	hyperbolic
C/2014 R1 (Borisov)	near-parabolic
C/2014 Q3 (Borisov)	Halley-type
C/2015 D4 (Borisov)	long-period
C/2016 R3 (Borisov)	long-period
C/2017 E1 (Borisov)	hyperbolic
2I/Borisov	hyperbolic, interstellar
C/2019 V1 (Borisov)	near-parabolic
C/2020 Q1 (Borisov)	long-period
C/2021 L3 (Borisov)	hyperbolic
C/2023 T2 (Borisov)	near-parabolic
C/2024 V1 (Borisov)	long-period
C/2025 B2 (Borisov)	hyperbolic
C/2025 J1 (Borisov)	near-parabolic
C/2025 V1 (Borisov)	hyperbolic

Borisov pursues astronomy in his spare time at his personal observatory MARGO located in Nauchnyi, in the southern part of the Crimean peninsula. Between 2013 and 2019, he discovered nine comets and several near-Earth objects (NEOs) such as 2013 TV135. These discoveries were made using telescopes he designed and built himself: GENON (2 comets), GENON Max (5 comets) and the HGB-650 0.65 m telescope (2 comets, including 2I/Borisov). In 2014, Borisov received two Edgar Wilson Awards for his discoveries of C/2013 N4 and C/2013 V2. Borisov also discovered the asteroid 2023 BU, another near-Earth object that passed within 4,000 km of the Earth in January 2023. He also observed cometary activity on NEO (523822) 2012 DG_{61}, making it a Near-Earth Comet (NEC). The cometary activity was later independently discovered and confirmed by scientists of the Active Asteroids project.

== Discovery of 2I/Borisov ==
In early 2019, Borisov completed his new 0.65-meter telescope. On August 30, 2019, he used this telescope to discover the first known interstellar comet, 2I/Borisov, which is only the second interstellar object to have been observed.

Borisov described his discovery thus:

I observed it on August 29, but it was August 30 GMT. I saw a moving object in the frame, it moved in a direction that was slightly different from that of main asteroids. (Note: Of the 800,000 objects known to orbit the Sun, 737,000 (92%) of them are main-belt asteroids.) I measured its coordinates and consulted the Minor Planet Center database. Turned out, it was a new object. Then I measured the near-Earth object rating, (Note: NEO Rating for calculating the probability that a new object is a near-Earth candidate.) it is calculated from various parameters, and it turned out to be 100% – in other words, dangerous. In such cases I must immediately post the parameters to the world webpage for confirmation of dangerous asteroids. (Note: The NEO Confirmation Page for confirming near-Earth objects and potentially hazardous objects.) I posted it and wrote that the object was diffuse and that it was not an asteroid, but a comet.

The discovery of 2I/Borisov by Gennadiy Borisov has been compared to the discovery of Pluto by Clyde Tombaugh. Tombaugh was also an amateur astronomer who was building his own telescopes, although he discovered Pluto using Lowell Observatory's astrograph.

== Discovery of 2023 BU ==
On January 21, 2023, Borisov discovered the relatively small asteroid 2023 BU, only 5 days before it would pass an initially calculated 9,975 ± 27 km (6,198 ± 17 mi) from the centerpoint of Earth, closer than geostationary satellites but further than low Earth orbit satellites.

== Views ==
Borisov thinks that soon amateur astronomers will no longer be able to discover new comets: "In 2016, only I discovered a comet. In 2013, there were seven of us. Every year there are less and less. There are more and more huge telescopes. Amateurs will soon have nothing left."

== See also ==
- List of comets discovered by Gennadiy Borisov
