= Borisov (surname) =

Borisov, or the female form Borisova, is a Bulgarian and Russian surname. It is derived from the male given name Boris and literally means Boris's. Notable people with the name include:

== Borisov ==
- Alexei Borisov (born 1960), Russian musician
- Alexey Borisov (1965–2021), Russian mathematician, Kovalevskaya Prize winner (2012)
- Aleksandr Borisov (disambiguation)
- Andrey Borisov (born 1990), Russian blogger and actor
- Arkady Borisov (1901–1942), Soviet corps commander
- Boris Borisov (born 1978), Bulgarian footballer
- Boris Borisov (actor) (1872–1939), Russian actor
- Borislav Borisov (disambiguation)
- Boyko Borisov (born 1959), Bulgarian politician, and three times prime minister of Bulgaria
- Deyan Borisov (born 1989), Bulgarian footballer
- Dmitri Borisov (disambiguation)
- Eduard Borisov (born 1934), a Soviet boxer
- Evgeniy Borisov (born 1984), Russian hurdler
- Fyodor Borisov (1892–?), Russian cyclist
- Georgi Borisov (born 1975), Bulgarian football player
- Gennadiy Borisov (born 1962), Crimean telescope maker and astronomer, after whom 2I/Borisov and C/2014 Q3 (Borisov) are named
- Igor Borisov (1924–2003), Russian rower
- Ivan Borisov (disambiguation)
- Krasimir Borisov (born 1950), Bulgarian footballer
- Lev Borisov (1933–2011), Russian actor
- Maxim Borisov (born 1995), Russian table hockey player
- Miloš Borisov (born 1985), Montenegrin basketball player
- Nikolay Borisov, Soviet Ukrainian writer and screenwriter
- Nikita Borisov (born 1977), cryptographer and computer security researcher
- Oleg Borisov (1929–1994), Soviet actor and People's Artist of the USSR
- Oleksiy Borysov (fl. 2012), Ukrainian sailor, later known as Aleksey Borisov
- Roman Borisov (born 1981), Russian footballer
- Sergey Borisov (disambiguation)
- Vadim Borisov (born 1955), Russian tennis player
- Valeriy Borisov (born 1966), Kazakhstani race walker
- Valery Borisov (disambiguation)
- Vasily Borisov (1922–2003), Soviet rifle shooter
- Veniamin Borisov (1935–2014), Russian painter
- Victor Borisov (1937–2013), Russian physicist and mathematician
- Victor Borisov-Musatov (1870–1905), Russian painter
- Viktor Borisov (born 1985), Russian footballer
- Vitaliy Borisov (born 1982), Azerbaijani futsal player
- Vladimir Borisov (1902–1941), Soviet general
- Vladislav Borisov (disambiguation)
- Vyacheslav Borisov (1955–2021), Russian general who commanded troops in the 2008 South Ossetian War
- Yasen Borisov (born 1962), Bulgarian badminton player
- Yegor Borisov (born 1954), Russian politician and former prime minister of Sakha Republic
- Yuri Borisov (disambiguation)
- Peter and Andrei Borisov, participants in the Decembrist revolt in Russia, 1925

== Borisova ==
- Albina Borisova (born 1952), Yakut writer
- Anna Borisova, pen name of Grigori Chkhartishvili (born 1956), Russian-Georgian writer
- Borislava Borisova (born 1951), Bulgarian and Swedish chess master
- Diana Borisova (born 1997), Russian rhythmic gymnast
- Ekaterina Borisova (born 1999), Russian pair skater
- Lyudmila Borisova (born 1966), Russian middle-distance runner
- Maria Borisova (born 1997), Russian water polo player
- Sanya Borisova (born 1983), Bulgarian actress
- Verka Borisova (born 1955), Bulgarian volleyball player
- Tatyana Borisova (born 1975), Kyrgyzstani middle-distance runner
- Yuliya Borisova (1925–2023), Soviet and Russian actress

== See also ==
- The dictionary definition of Borisov at Wiktionary
