= Borisovo, Russia =

Borisovo (Russian: Борисово) is the name of several rural localities in Russia.

== Altai Krai ==
As of 2010, one rural locality in Altai Krai bears this name:

- Borisovo, Altai Krai, a selo in Borisovsky Selsoviet of Zalesovsky District

== Amur Oblast ==
As of 2010, one rural locality in Amur Oblast bears this name:

- Borisovo, Amur Oblast, a selo in Romanovsky Rural Settlement of Oktyabrsky District

== Republic of Bashkortostan ==
As of 2010, one rural locality in the Republic of Bashkortostan bears this name:

- Borisovo, Republic of Bashkortostan, a village in Gusevsky Selsoviet of Abzelilovsky District

== Belgorod Oblast ==
As of 2010, one rural locality in Belgorod Oblast bears this name:

- Borisovo, Belgorod Oblast, a selo in Nasonovsky Rural Okrug of Valuysky District

== Bryansk Oblast ==
As of 2010, one rural locality in Bryansk Oblast bears this name:

- Borisovo, Bryansk Oblast, a selo in Pushkinsky Selsoviet of Sevsky District

== Irkutsk Oblast ==
As of 2010, one rural locality in Irkutsk Oblast bears this name:

- Borisovo, Irkutsk Oblast, a selo in Tayshetsky District

== Ivanovo Oblast ==
As of 2010, two rural localities in Ivanovo Oblast bear this name:

- Borisovo, Pestyakovsky District, Ivanovo Oblast, a village in Pestyakovsky District
- Borisovo, Puchezhsky District, Ivanovo Oblast, a village in Puchezhsky District

== Kaluga Oblast ==
As of 2010, two rural localities in Kaluga Oblast bear this name:

- Borisovo, Borovsky District, Kaluga Oblast, a village in Borovsky District
- Borisovo, Meshchovsky District, Kaluga Oblast, a village in Meshchovsky District

== Kemerovo Oblast ==
As of 2010, one rural locality in Kemerovo Oblast bears this name:

- Borisovo, Kemerovo Oblast, a selo in Borisovskaya Rural Territory of Krapivinsky District

== Kostroma Oblast ==
As of 2010, three rural localities in Kostroma Oblast bear this name:

- Borisovo, Chukhlomsky District, Kostroma Oblast, a village in Pankratovskoye Settlement of Chukhlomsky District
- Borisovo, Kadyysky District, Kostroma Oblast, a village in Yekaterinkinskoye Settlement of Kadyysky District
- Borisovo, Neysky District, Kostroma Oblast, a village in Vozherovskoye Settlement of Neysky District

== Leningrad Oblast ==
As of 2010, three rural localities in Leningrad Oblast bear this name:

- Borisovo, Boksitogorsky District, Leningrad Oblast, a village in Bolshedvorskoye Settlement Municipal Formation of Boksitogorsky District
- Borisovo, Gatchinsky District, Leningrad Oblast, a village under the administrative jurisdiction of Vyritskoye Settlement Municipal Formation of Gatchinsky District
- Borisovo, Priozersky District, Leningrad Oblast, a village in Razdolyevskoye Settlement Municipal Formation of Priozersky District

== Moscow Oblast ==
As of 2010, eight rural localities in Moscow Oblast bear this name:

- Borisovo, Domodedovo, Moscow Oblast, a village under the administrative jurisdiction of the Domodedovo Town Under Oblast Jurisdiction
- Borisovo, Dmitrovsky District, Moscow Oblast, a selo under the administrative jurisdiction of the Town of Dmitrov in Dmitrovsky District
- Borisovo, Klinsky District, Moscow Oblast, a village under the administrative jurisdiction of the Town of Klin in Klinsky District
- Borisovo, Kolomensky District, Moscow Oblast, a village in Nepetsinskoye Rural Settlement of Kolomensky District
- Borisovo, Mozhaysky District, Moscow Oblast, a selo in Borisovskoye Rural Settlement of Mozhaysky District
- Borisovo, Pavlovo-Posadsky District, Moscow Oblast, a village in Kuznetsovskoye Rural Settlement of Pavlovo-Posadsky District
- Borisovo, Sergiyevo-Posadsky District, Moscow Oblast, a village under the administrative jurisdiction of the work settlement of Bogorodskoye in Sergiyevo-Posadsky District
- Borisovo, Serpukhovsky District, Moscow Oblast, a village in Dankovskoye Rural Settlement of Serpukhovsky District

== Nizhny Novgorod Oblast ==
As of 2010, one rural locality in Nizhny Novgorod Oblast bears this name:

- Borisovo, Nizhny Novgorod Oblast, a village in Lindovsky Selsoviet of the town of oblast significance of Bor

== Novgorod Oblast ==
As of 2010, eight rural localities in Novgorod Oblast bear this name:

- Borisovo, Krasnoborskoye Settlement, Kholmsky District, Novgorod Oblast, a village in Krasnoborskoye Settlement of Kholmsky District
- Borisovo, Togodskoye Settlement, Kholmsky District, Novgorod Oblast, a village in Togodskoye Settlement of Kholmsky District
- Borisovo, Krestetsky District, Novgorod Oblast, a village in Novorakhinskoye Settlement of Krestetsky District
- Borisovo, Maryovsky District, Novgorod Oblast, a village in Moiseyevskoye Settlement of Maryovsky District
- Borisovo, Moshenskoy District, Novgorod Oblast, a village in Kirovskoye Settlement of Moshenskoy District
- Borisovo, Pestovsky District, Novgorod Oblast, a village in Pestovskoye Settlement of Pestovsky District
- Borisovo, Starorussky District, Novgorod Oblast, a village in Nagovskoye Settlement of Starorussky District
- Borisovo, Valdaysky District, Novgorod Oblast, a village in Roshchinskoye Settlement of Valdaysky District

== Perm Krai ==
As of 2010, two rural localities in Perm Krai bear this name:

- Borisovo, Chusovoy, Perm Krai, a village under the administrative jurisdiction of the town of krai significance of Chusovoy
- Borisovo, Ilyinsky District, Perm Krai, a village in Ilyinsky District

== Pskov Oblast ==
As of 2010, eight rural localities in Pskov Oblast bear this name:

- Borisovo, Dedovichsky District, Pskov Oblast, a village in Dedovichsky District
- Borisovo, Krasnogorodsky District, Pskov Oblast, a village in Krasnogorodsky District
- Borisovo, Nevelsky District, Pskov Oblast, a village in Nevelsky District
- Borisovo (Runovskaya Rural Settlement), Novosokolnichesky District, Pskov Oblast, a village in Novosokolnichesky District; municipally, a part of Runovskaya Rural Settlement of that district
- Borisovo (Gorozhanskaya Rural Settlement), Novosokolnichesky District, Pskov Oblast, a village in Novosokolnichesky District; municipally, a part of Gorozhanskaya Rural Settlement of that district
- Borisovo (Mayevskaya Rural Settlement), Novosokolnichesky District, Pskov Oblast, a village in Novosokolnichesky District; municipally, a part of Mayevskaya Rural Settlement of that district
- Borisovo, Opochetsky District, Pskov Oblast, a village in Opochetsky District
- Borisovo, Porkhovsky District, Pskov Oblast, a village in Porkhovsky District

== Ryazan Oblast ==
As of 2010, one rural locality in Ryazan Oblast bears this name:

- Borisovo, Ryazan Oblast, a village in Zadne-Pilevsky Rural Okrug of Klepikovsky District

== Smolensk Oblast ==
As of 2010, one rural locality in Smolensk Oblast bears this name:

- Borisovo, Smolensk Oblast, a village in Pigulinskoye Rural Settlement of Kholm-Zhirkovsky District

== Tula Oblast ==
As of 2010, four rural localities in Tula Oblast bear this name:

- Borisovo, Aleksinsky District, Tula Oblast, a village in Borisovsky Rural Okrug of Aleksinsky District
- Borisovo, Leninsky District, Tula Oblast, a village in Zaytsevsky Rural Okrug of Leninsky District
- Borisovo, Suvorovsky District, Tula Oblast, a village in Zyabrevskaya Rural Territory of Suvorovsky District
- Borisovo, Yasnogorsky District, Tula Oblast, a village in Klimovskaya Rural Territory of Yasnogorsky District

== Tver Oblast ==
As of 2010, nine rural localities in Tver Oblast bear this name:

- Borisovo, Kalininsky District, Tver Oblast, a village in Kalininsky District
- Borisovo, Kimrsky District, Tver Oblast, a village in Kimrsky District
- Borisovo, Kuvshinovsky District, Tver Oblast, a village in Kuvshinovsky District
- Borisovo, Nelidovsky District, Tver Oblast, a village in Nelidovsky District
- Borisovo (Itomlya Rural Settlement), Rzhevsky District, Tver Oblast, a village in Rzhevsky District; municipally, a part of Itomlya Rural Settlement of that district
- Borisovo (Pobeda Rural Settlement), Rzhevsky District, Tver Oblast, a village in Rzhevsky District; municipally, a part of Pobeda Rural Settlement of that district
- Borisovo (Yeletskoye Rural Settlement), Selizharovsky District, Tver Oblast, a village in Selizharovsky District; municipally, a part of Yeletskoye Rural Settlement of that district
- Borisovo (Okovetskoye Rural Settlement), Selizharovsky District, Tver Oblast, a village in Selizharovsky District; municipally, a part of Okovetskoye Rural Settlement of that district
- Borisovo, Staritsky District, Tver Oblast, a village in Staritsky District

== Udmurt Republic ==
As of 2010, one rural locality in the Udmurt Republic bears this name:

- Borisovo, Udmurt Republic, a village in Sigayevsky Selsoviet of Sarapulsky District

== Vladimir Oblast ==
As of 2010, three rural localities in Vladimir Oblast bear this name:

- Borisovo (Grigoryevskoye Rural Settlement), Gus-Khrustalny District, Vladimir Oblast, a village in Gus-Khrustalny District; municipally, a part of Grigoryevskoye Rural Settlement of that district
- Borisovo (Zolotkovo Rural Settlement), Gus-Khrustalny District, Vladimir Oblast, a village in Gus-Khrustalny District; municipally, a part of Zolotkovo Rural Settlement of that district
- Borisovo, Muromsky District, Vladimir Oblast, a selo in Muromsky District

== Vologda Oblast ==
As of 2010, fourteen rural localities in Vologda Oblast bear this name:

- Borisovo, Babushkinsky District, Vologda Oblast, a village in Bereznikovsky Selsoviet of Babushkinsky District
- Borisovo, Chagodoshchensky District, Vologda Oblast, a settlement in Borisovsky Selsoviet of Chagodoshchensky District
- Borisovo, Irdomatsky Selsoviet, Cherepovetsky District, Vologda Oblast, a village in Irdomatsky Selsoviet of Cherepovetsky District
- Borisovo, Yargomzhsky Selsoviet, Cherepovetsky District, Vologda Oblast, a village in Yargomzhsky Selsoviet of Cherepovetsky District
- Borisovo, Kaduysky District, Vologda Oblast, a village in Andronovsky Selsoviet of Kaduysky District
- Borisovo, Churovsky Selsoviet, Sheksninsky District, Vologda Oblast, a village in Churovsky Selsoviet of Sheksninsky District
- Borisovo, Yeremeyevsky Selsoviet, Sheksninsky District, Vologda Oblast, a village in Yeremeyevsky Selsoviet of Sheksninsky District
- Borisovo, Sokolsky District, Vologda Oblast, a village in Chuchkovsky Selsoviet of Sokolsky District
- Borisovo, Vashkinsky District, Vologda Oblast, a village in Andreyevsky Selsoviet of Vashkinsky District
- Borisovo, Borisovsky Selsoviet, Vologodsky District, Vologda Oblast, a village in Borisovsky Selsoviet of Vologodsky District
- Borisovo, Priluksky Selsoviet, Vologodsky District, Vologda Oblast, a village in Priluksky Selsoviet of Vologodsky District
- Borisovo, Vozhegodsky District, Vologda Oblast, a village in Lipino-Kalikinsky Selsoviet of Vozhegodsky District
- Borisovo, Ankhimovsky Selsoviet, Vytegorsky District, Vologda Oblast, a village in Ankhimovsky Selsoviet of Vytegorsky District
- Borisovo, Kemsky Selsoviet, Vytegorsky District, Vologda Oblast, a village in Kemsky Selsoviet of Vytegorsky District

== Yaroslavl Oblast ==
As of 2010, ten rural localities in Yaroslavl Oblast bear this name:

- Borisovo, Bolsheselsky District, Yaroslavl Oblast, a village in Bolsheselsky Rural Okrug of Bolsheselsky District
- Borisovo, Danilovsky District, Yaroslavl Oblast, a village in Semivragovsky Rural Okrug of Danilovsky District
- Borisovo, Stavotinsky Rural Okrug, Gavrilov-Yamsky District, Yaroslavl Oblast, a village in Stavotinsky Rural Okrug of Gavrilov-Yamsky District
- Borisovo, Zayachye-Kholmsky Rural Okrug, Gavrilov-Yamsky District, Yaroslavl Oblast, a village in Zayachye-Kholmsky Rural Okrug of Gavrilov-Yamsky District
- Borisovo, Nekrasovsky District, Yaroslavl Oblast, a village in Grebovsky Rural Okrug of Nekrasovsky District
- Borisovo, Glebovsky Rural Okrug, Pereslavsky District, Yaroslavl Oblast, a village in Glebovsky Rural Okrug of Pereslavsky District
- Borisovo, Lyubimtsevsky Rural Okrug, Pereslavsky District, Yaroslavl Oblast, a village in Lyubimtsevsky Rural Okrug of Pereslavsky District
- Borisovo, Tutayevsky District, Yaroslavl Oblast, a village in Rodionovsky Rural Okrug of Tutayevsky District
- Borisovo, Kuznechikhinsky Rural Okrug, Yaroslavsky District, Yaroslavl Oblast, a village in Kuznechikhinsky Rural Okrug of Yaroslavsky District
- Borisovo, Teleginsky Rural Okrug, Yaroslavsky District, Yaroslavl Oblast, a village in Teleginsky Rural Okrug of Yaroslavsky District
