= Borisov =

Borisov or Borisova may refer to:

== Places ==
- Barysaw, or Borisov, Belarus
  - Borisov Arena, a football stadium
  - Battle of Borisov, 1812
- Borisov, Volgograd Oblast, Russia
- Borišov, a mountain in Slovakia
- Borisova, Perm Krai, Russia
- Borisova gradina, a park in Sofia

== Other uses ==
- Borisov (name), and Borisova, a surname, including a list of people with the name
- 2I/Borisov, an interstellar comet
- C/2014 Q3 (Borisov), a periodic comet

== See also ==
- Borisovka, the name of several inhabited localities in Russia
- Borisovo (disambiguation)
- Borisovsky (disambiguation)
