= Kortrokhovo =

Kortrokhovo Котрохово
- Village
- Location within Ivanovo Oblast Location within Russia
- Coordinates: 56°38′N 42°26′E
- Country: Russia
- Region: Ivanovo Oblast
- District: Pestyakovsky District
- Time zone: UTC+3:00

Kortrokhovo (Russian: Котрохово) is a rural locality (a village) in Pestyakovsky District, Ivanovo Oblast, Russia. Population: 6 (2010 census);

== Geography ==
This rural locality is located 16 kilometres (9.9 mi) from Pestyaki (the district's administrative centre), 99 kilometres (62 mi) from Ivanovo (capital of Ivanovo Oblast) and 311 kilometres (193 mi) from Moscow. Volkovo is the nearest rural locality.
