= Kokusha =

Kokusha Кокуша
- Village
- Location within Ivanovo Oblast Location within Russia
- Coordinates: 56°42′N 42°45′E
- Country: Russia
- Region: Ivanovo Oblast
- District: Pestyakovsky District
- Time zone: UTC+3:00

Kokusha (Russian: Кокуша) is a rural locality (a village) in Pestyakovsky District, Ivanovo Oblast, Russia. Population: 17 (2010 census);

== Geography ==
This rural locality is located 5 kilometres (3.1 mi) from Pestyaki (the district's administrative centre), 113 kilometres (70 mi) from Ivanovo (capital of Ivanovo Oblast) and 331 kilometres (206 mi) from Moscow. Gurkino is the nearest rural locality.
