= Nizhny Landekh =

Nizhny Landekh Нижний Ландех
- Village
- Location within Ivanovo Oblast Location within Russia
- Coordinates: 56°39′N 42°25′E
- Country: Russia
- Region: Ivanovo Oblast
- District: Pestyakovsky District
- Time zone: UTC+3:00

Nizhny Landekh (Russian: Нижний Ландех) is a rural locality (a selo) in Pestyakovsky District, Ivanovo Oblast, Russia. Population: 630 (2010 census);

== Geography ==
This rural locality is located 16 kilometres (9.9 mi) from Pestyaki (the district's administrative centre), 96 kilometres (60 mi) from Ivanovo (capital of Ivanovo Oblast) and 310 kilometres (190 mi) from Moscow. Pershino is the nearest rural locality.
