= Neverovo-Sloboda =

Neverovo-Sloboda Неверово-Слобода
- Village
- Location within Ivanovo Oblast Location within Russia
- Coordinates: 56°34′N 42°40′E
- Country: Russia
- Region: Ivanovo Oblast
- District: Pestyakovsky District
- Time zone: UTC+3:00

Neverovo-Sloboda (Russian: Неверово-Слобода) is a rural locality (a village) in Pestyakovsky District, Ivanovo Oblast, Russia. Population: 260 (2010 census);

== Geography ==
This rural locality is located 14 kilometres (8.7 mi) from Pestyaki (the district's administrative centre), 114 kilometres (71 mi) from Ivanovo (capital of Ivanovo Oblast) and 323 kilometres (201 mi) from Moscow. Filenkovo Pervoye is the nearest rural locality.
