= Pokhmelino =

Pokhmelino Похмелино
- Village
- Location within Ivanovo Oblast Location within Russia
- Coordinates: 56°44′N 42°40′E
- Country: Russia
- Region: Ivanovo Oblast
- District: Pestyakovsky District
- Time zone: UTC+3:00

Pokhmelino (Russian: Похмелино) is a rural locality (a village) in Pestyakovsky District, Ivanovo Oblast, Russia. Population: 9 (2010 census);

== Geography ==
This rural locality is located 3 kilometres (1.9 mi) from Pestyaki (the district's administrative centre), 108 kilometres (67 mi) from Ivanovo (capital of Ivanovo Oblast) and 327 kilometres (203 mi) from Moscow. Lavrushkino is the nearest rural locality.
