= Strelka Bolshaya =

Strelka Bolshaya Стрелка Большая
- Village
- Location within Ivanovo Oblast Location within Russia
- Coordinates: 56°46′N 42°44′E
- Country: Russia
- Region: Ivanovo Oblast
- District: Pestyakovsky District
- Time zone: UTC+3:00

Strelka Bolshaya (Russian: Стрелка Большая) is a rural locality (a village) in Pestyakovsky District, Ivanovo Oblast, Russia. Population: 6 (2010 census);

== Geography ==
This rural locality is located 8 kilometres (5.0 mi) from Pestyaki (the district's administrative centre), 111 kilometres (69 mi) from Ivanovo (capital of Ivanovo Oblast) and 332 kilometres (206 mi) from Moscow. Kruty is the nearest rural locality.
