= Skoba, Ivanovo Oblast =

Skoba Скоба
- Village
- Location within Ivanovo Oblast Location within Russia
- Coordinates: 56°42′N 42°43′E
- Country: Russia
- Region: Ivanovo Oblast
- District: Pestyakovsky District
- Time zone: UTC+3:00

Skoba (Russian: Скоба) is a rural locality (a village) in Pestyakovsky District, Ivanovo Oblast, Russia. Population: 5 (2010 census);

== Geography ==
This rural locality is located 3 kilometres (1.9 mi) from Pestyaki (the district's administrative centre), 112 kilometres (70 mi) from Ivanovo (capital of Ivanovo Oblast) and 329 kilometres (204 mi) from Moscow. Semyonovo is the nearest rural locality.
