= Galashovo =

Galashovo Галашово
- Village
- Location within Ivanovo Oblast Location within Russia
- Coordinates: 56°40′N 42°38′E
- Country: Russia
- Region: Ivanovo Oblast
- District: Pestyakovsky District
- Time zone: UTC+3:00

Galashovo (Russian: Галашово) is a rural locality (a village) in Pestyakovsky District, Ivanovo Oblast, Russia. Population: 69 (2010 census);

== Geography ==
This rural locality is located 4 kilometres (2.5 mi) from Pestyaki (the district's administrative centre), 108 kilometres (67 mi) from Ivanovo (capital of Ivanovo Oblast) and 323 kilometres (201 mi) from Moscow. Cherepovo is the nearest rural locality.
