= Palagino =

Palagino Палагино
- Village
- Location within Ivanovo Oblast Location within Russia
- Coordinates: 56°36′N 42°34′E
- Country: Russia
- Region: Ivanovo Oblast
- District: Pestyakovsky District
- Time zone: UTC+3:00

Palagino (Russian: Палагино) is a rural locality (a village) in Pestyakovsky District, Ivanovo Oblast, Russia. Population: 53 (2010 census);

== Geography ==
This rural locality is located 14 kilometres (8.7 mi) from Pestyaki (the district's administrative centre), 107 kilometres (66 mi) from Ivanovo (capital of Ivanovo Oblast) and 317 kilometres (197 mi) from Moscow. Georgiyevskoye is the nearest rural locality.
