= Bolobino =

Bolobino Болобино
- Village
- Location within Ivanovo Oblast Location within Russia
- Coordinates: 56°44′N 42°33′E
- Country: Russia
- Region: Ivanovo Oblast
- District: Pestyakovsky District
- Time zone: UTC+3:00

Bolobino (Russian: Болобино) is a rural locality (a village) in Pestyakovsky District, Ivanovo Oblast, Russia. Population: 17 (2010 census);

== Geography ==
This rural locality is located 8 kilometres (5.0 mi) from Pestyaki (the district's administrative centre), 101 kilometres (63 mi) from Ivanovo (capital of Ivanovo Oblast) and 320 kilometres (200 mi) from Moscow. Zarubino is the nearest rural locality.
