= Pureshka =

Pureshka Пурешка
- Village
- Location within Ivanovo Oblast Location within Russia
- Coordinates: 56°28′N 42°38′E
- Country: Russia
- Region: Ivanovo Oblast
- District: Pestyakovsky District
- Time zone: UTC+3:00

Pureshka (Russian: Пурешка) is a rural locality (a village) in Pestyakovsky District, Ivanovo Oblast, Russia. Population: 6 (2010 census);

== Geography ==
This rural locality is located 25 kilometres (16 mi) from Pestyaki (the district's administrative centre), 117 kilometres (73 mi) from Ivanovo (capital of Ivanovo Oblast) and 318 kilometres (198 mi) from Moscow. Mugrevsky Bor is the nearest rural locality.
