= Sezukh =

Sezukh Сезух
- Village
- Location within Ivanovo Oblast Location within Russia
- Coordinates: 56°29′N 42°42′E
- Country: Russia
- Region: Ivanovo Oblast
- District: Pestyakovsky District
- Time zone: UTC+3:00

Sezukh (Russian: Сезух) is a rural locality (a village) in Pestyakovsky District, Ivanovo Oblast, Russia. Population: 94 (2010 census);

== Geography ==
This rural locality is located 24 kilometres (15 mi) from Pestyaki (the district's administrative centre), 120 kilometres (75 mi) from Ivanovo (capital of Ivanovo Oblast) and 323 kilometres (201 mi) from Moscow. Stary Sezukh is the nearest rural locality.
