= Lavrushkino =

Lavrushkino Лаврушкино
- Village
- Location within Ivanovo Oblast Location within Russia
- Coordinates: 56°43′N 42°39′E
- Country: Russia
- Region: Ivanovo Oblast
- District: Pestyakovsky District
- Time zone: UTC+3:00

Lavrushkino (Russian: Лаврушкино) is a rural locality (a village) in Pestyakovsky District, Ivanovo Oblast, Russia. Population: 16 (2010 census);

== Geography ==
This rural locality is located 3 kilometres (1.9 mi) from Pestyaki (the district's administrative centre), 107 kilometres (66 mi) from Ivanovo (capital of Ivanovo Oblast) and 326 kilometres (203 mi) from Moscow. Parshino is the nearest rural locality.
