= Mugreyevsky Bor =

Mugreyevsky Bor Мугреевский Бор
- Village
- Location within Ivanovo Oblast Location within Russia
- Coordinates: 56°26′N 42°37′E
- Country: Russia
- Region: Ivanovo Oblast
- District: Pestyakovsky District
- Time zone: UTC+3:00

Mugreyevsky Bor (Russian: Мугреевский Бор) is a rural locality (a settlement) in Pestyakovsky District, Ivanovo Oblast, Russia. Population: 25 (2010 census);

== Geography ==
This rural locality is located 29 kilometres (18 mi) from Pestyaki (the district's administrative centre), 119 kilometres (74 mi) from Ivanovo (capital of Ivanovo Oblast) and 317 kilometres (197 mi) from Moscow. Frolishchi is the nearest rural locality.
