= Zarubino, Pestyakovsky District, Ivanovo Oblast =

Zarubino Зарубино
- Village
- Location within Ivanovo Oblast Location within Russia
- Coordinates: 56°44′N 42°33′E
- Country: Russia
- Region: Ivanovo Oblast
- District: Pestyakovsky District
- Time zone: UTC+3:00

Zarubino (Russian: Зарубино) is a rural locality (a village) in Pestyakovsky District, Ivanovo Oblast, Russia. Population: 13 (2010 census);

== Geography ==
This rural locality is located 8 kilometres (5.0 mi) from Pestyaki (the district's administrative centre), 101 kilometres (63 mi) from Ivanovo (capital of Ivanovo Oblast) and 321 kilometres (199 mi) from Moscow. Bolobino is the nearest rural locality.
