= Dubovichye =

Dubovichye Дубовичье
- Village
- Location within Ivanovo Oblast Location within Russia
- Coordinates: 56°39′N 42°18′E
- Country: Russia
- Region: Ivanovo Oblast
- District: Pestyakovsky District
- Time zone: UTC+3:00

Dubovichye (Russian: Дубовичье) is a rural locality (a village) in Pestyakovsky District, Ivanovo Oblast, Russia. Population: 56 (2010 census);

== Geography ==
This rural locality is located 24 kilometres (15 mi) from Pestyaki (the district's administrative centre), 89 kilometres (55 mi) from Ivanovo (capital of Ivanovo Oblast) and 303 kilometres (188 mi) from Moscow. Mugreyevo-Nikolskoye is the nearest rural locality.
