= Shalganovo =

Shalganovo Шалганово
- Village
- Location within Ivanovo Oblast Location within Russia
- Coordinates: 56°34′N 42°52′E
- Country: Russia
- Region: Ivanovo Oblast
- District: Pestyakovsky District
- Time zone: UTC+3:00

Shalganovo (Russian: Шалганово) is a rural locality (a village) in Pestyakovsky District, Ivanovo Oblast, Russia. Population: 5 (2010 census);

== Geography ==
This rural locality is located 19 kilometres (12 mi) from Pestyaki (the district's administrative centre), 126 kilometres (78 mi) from Ivanovo (capital of Ivanovo Oblast) and 334 kilometres (208 mi) from Moscow. Gavrilishchi is the nearest rural locality.
