= Verbino =

Verbino Вербино
- Village
- Location within Ivanovo Oblast Location within Russia
- Coordinates: 56°38′N 42°43′E
- Country: Russia
- Region: Ivanovo Oblast
- District: Pestyakovsky District
- Time zone: UTC+3:00

Verbino (Russian: Вербино) is a rural locality (a village) in Pestyakovsky District, Ivanovo Oblast, Russia. Population: 72 (2010 census);

== Geography ==
This rural locality is located 9 kilometres (5.6 mi) from Pestyaki (the district's administrative centre), 115 kilometres (71 mi) from Ivanovo (capital of Ivanovo Oblast) and 328 kilometres (204 mi) from Moscow. Keregino is the nearest rural locality.
