= Parshino, Pestyakovsky District, Ivanovo Oblast =

Parshino Паршино
- Village
- Location within Ivanovo Oblast Location within Russia
- Coordinates: 56°43′N 42°38′E
- Country: Russia
- Region: Ivanovo Oblast
- District: Pestyakovsky District
- Time zone: UTC+3:00

Parshino (Russian: Паршино) is a rural locality (a village) in Pestyakovsky District, Ivanovo Oblast, Russia. Population: 18 (2010 census);

== Geography ==
This rural locality is located 3 kilometres (1.9 mi) from Pestyaki (the district's administrative centre), 107 kilometres (66 mi) from Ivanovo (capital of Ivanovo Oblast) and 325 kilometres (202 mi) from Moscow. Lavrushkino is the nearest rural locality.
