= Filyata =

Filyata Филята
- Village
- Location within Ivanovo Oblast Location within Russia
- Coordinates: 56°43′N 42°35′E
- Country: Russia
- Region: Ivanovo Oblast
- District: Pestyakovsky District
- Time zone: UTC+3:00

Filyata (Russian: Филята) is a rural locality (a village) in Pestyakovsky District, Ivanovo Oblast, Russia. Population: 212 (2010 census);

== Geography ==
This rural locality is located 6 kilometres (3.7 mi) from Pestyaki (the district's administrative centre), 103 kilometres (64 mi) from Ivanovo (capital of Ivanovo Oblast) and 322 kilometres (200 mi) from Moscow. Timagino is the nearest rural locality.
