= Mordvinovo, Ivanovo Oblast =

Mordvinovo Мордвиново
- Village
- Location within Ivanovo Oblast Location within Russia
- Coordinates: 56°33′N 42°49′E
- Country: Russia
- Region: Ivanovo Oblast
- District: Pestyakovsky District
- Time zone: UTC+3:00

Mordvinovo (Russian: Мордвиново) is a rural locality (a village) in Pestyakovsky District, Ivanovo Oblast, Russia. Population: 71 (2010 census);

== Geography ==
This rural locality is located 18 kilometres (11 mi) from Pestyaki (the district's administrative centre), 123 kilometres (76 mi) from Ivanovo (capital of Ivanovo Oblast) and 331 kilometres (206 mi) from Moscow. Ushevo is the nearest rural locality.
