= Kozlikha, Pestyakovsky District, Ivanovo Oblast =

Kozlikha Козлиха
- Village
- Location within Ivanovo Oblast Location within Russia
- Coordinates: 56°35′N 42°43′E
- Country: Russia
- Region: Ivanovo Oblast
- District: Pestyakovsky District
- Time zone: UTC+3:00

Kozlikha (Russian: Козлиха) is a rural locality (a village) in Pestyakovsky District, Ivanovo Oblast, Russia. Population: 5 (2010 census);

== Geography ==
This rural locality is located 13 kilometres (8.1 mi) from Pestyaki (the district's administrative centre), 116 kilometres (72 mi) from Ivanovo (capital of Ivanovo Oblast) and 326 kilometres (203 mi) from Moscow. Vereshchagino is the nearest rural locality.
