= Prudki, Ivanovo Oblast =

Prudki Прудки
- Village
- Location within Ivanovo Oblast Location within Russia
- Coordinates: 56°37′N 42°45′E
- Country: Russia
- Region: Ivanovo Oblast
- District: Pestyakovsky District
- Time zone: UTC+3:00

Prudki (Russian: Прудки) is a rural locality (a village) in Pestyakovsky District, Ivanovo Oblast, Russia. Population: 6 (2010 census);

== Geography ==
This rural locality is located 10 kilometres (6.2 mi) from Pestyaki (the district's administrative centre), 117 kilometres (73 mi) from Ivanovo (capital of Ivanovo Oblast) and 329 kilometres (204 mi) from Moscow. Kupalishchi is the nearest rural locality.
