= Osinki, Ivanovo Oblast =

Osinki Осинки
- Village
- Location within Ivanovo Oblast Location within Russia
- Coordinates: 56°33′N 42°50′E
- Country: Russia
- Region: Ivanovo Oblast
- District: Pestyakovsky District
- Time zone: UTC+3:00

Osinki (Russian: Осинки) is a rural locality (a village) in Pestyakovsky District, Ivanovo Oblast, Russia. Population: 10 (2010 census);

== Geography ==
This rural locality is located 20 kilometres (12 mi) from Pestyaki (the district's administrative centre), 125 kilometres (78 mi) from Ivanovo (capital of Ivanovo Oblast) and 333 kilometres (207 mi) from Moscow. Gavrilishchi is the nearest rural locality.
