= Alyokhino, Pestyakovsky District, Ivanovo Oblast =

Alyokhino Алёхино
- Village
- Location within Ivanovo Oblast Location within Russia
- Coordinates: 56°36′N 42°35′E
- Country: Russia
- Region: Ivanovo Oblast
- District: Pestyakovsky District
- Time zone: UTC+3:00

Alyokhino (Russian: Алёхино) is a rural locality (a selo) in Pestyakovsky District, Ivanovo Oblast, Russia. Population: 261 (2010 census);

== Geography ==
This rural locality is located 12 kilometres (7.5 mi) from Pestyaki (the district's administrative centre), 108 kilometres (67 mi) from Ivanovo (capital of Ivanovo Oblast) and 319 kilometres (198 mi) from Moscow. Belaya Ramen is the nearest rural locality.
