= Shalayevo =

Shalayevo Шалаево
- Village
- Location within Ivanovo Oblast Location within Russia
- Coordinates: 56°41′N 42°45′E
- Country: Russia
- Region: Ivanovo Oblast
- District: Pestyakovsky District
- Time zone: UTC+3:00

Shalayevo (Russian: Шалаево) is a rural locality (a village) in Pestyakovsky District, Ivanovo Oblast, Russia. Population: 206 (2010 census);

== Geography ==
This rural locality is located 5 kilometres (3.1 mi) from Pestyaki (the district's administrative centre), 114 kilometres (71 mi) from Ivanovo (capital of Ivanovo Oblast) and 330 kilometres (210 mi) from Moscow. Salovarovo is the nearest rural locality.
