= Vashkino =

Vashkino Вашкино
- Village
- Location within Ivanovo Oblast Location within Russia
- Coordinates: 56°36′N 42°44′E
- Country: Russia
- Region: Ivanovo Oblast
- District: Pestyakovsky District
- Time zone: UTC+3:00

Vashkino (Russian: Вашкино) is a rural locality (a village) in Pestyakovsky District, Ivanovo Oblast, Russia. Population: 13 (2010 census);

== Geography ==
This rural locality is located 13 kilometres (8.1 mi) from Pestyaki (the district's administrative centre), 117 kilometres (73 mi) from Ivanovo (capital of Ivanovo Oblast) and 328 kilometres (204 mi) from Moscow. Nikulino is the nearest rural locality.
