= Cherepovo, Ivanovo Oblast =

Cherepovo Черепово
- Village
- Location within Ivanovo Oblast Location within Russia
- Coordinates: 56°41′N 42°37′E
- Country: Russia
- Region: Ivanovo Oblast
- District: Pestyakovsky District
- Time zone: UTC+3:00

Cherepovo (Russian: Черепово) is a rural locality (a village) in Pestyakovsky District, Ivanovo Oblast, Russia. Population: 10 (2010 census);

== Geography ==
This rural locality is located 4 kilometres (2.5 mi) from Pestyaki (the district's administrative centre), 107 kilometres (66 mi) from Ivanovo (capital of Ivanovo Oblast) and 323 kilometres (201 mi) from Moscow. Galashovo is the nearest rural locality.
