= Mikhaylovskaya, Pestyakovsky District, Ivanovo Oblast =

Mikhaylovskaya Михайловская
- Village
- Location within Ivanovo Oblast Location within Russia
- Coordinates: 56°34′N 42°46′E
- Country: Russia
- Region: Ivanovo Oblast
- District: Pestyakovsky District
- Time zone: UTC+3:00

Mikhaylovskaya (Russian: Михайловская) is a rural locality (a village) in Pestyakovsky District, Ivanovo Oblast, Russia. Population: 9 (2010 census);

== Geography ==
This rural locality is located 17 kilometres (11 mi) from Pestyaki (the district's administrative centre), 121 kilometres (75 mi) from Ivanovo (capital of Ivanovo Oblast) and 329 kilometres (204 mi) from Moscow. Yakushevo is the nearest rural locality.
