= Shcherbinino, Ivanovo Oblast =

Shcherbinino Щербинино
- Village
- Location within Ivanovo Oblast Location within Russia
- Coordinates: 56°36′N 42°29′E
- Country: Russia
- Region: Ivanovo Oblast
- District: Pestyakovsky District
- Time zone: UTC+3:00

Shcherbinino (Russian: Щербинино) is a rural locality (a village) in Pestyakovsky District, Ivanovo Oblast, Russia. Population: 28 (2010 census);

== Geography ==
This rural locality is located 16 kilometres (9.9 mi) from Pestyaki (the district's administrative centre), 102 kilometres (63 mi) from Ivanovo (capital of Ivanovo Oblast) and 313 kilometres (194 mi) from Moscow. Yemelyanovo is the nearest rural locality.
