= Gogino =

Gogino Гогино
- Village
- Location within Ivanovo Oblast Location within Russia
- Coordinates: 56°37′N 42°41′E
- Country: Russia
- Region: Ivanovo Oblast
- District: Pestyakovsky District
- Time zone: UTC+3:00

Gogino (Russian: Гогино) is a rural locality (a village) in Pestyakovsky District, Ivanovo Oblast, Russia. Population: 5 (2010 census);

== Geography ==
This rural locality is located 9 kilometres (5.6 mi) from Pestyaki (the district's administrative centre), 114 kilometres (71 mi) from Ivanovo (capital of Ivanovo Oblast) and 325 kilometres (202 mi) from Moscow. Matyugino is the nearest rural locality.
