= Khaneyevka =

Khaneyevka Ханеевка
- Village
- Location within Ivanovo Oblast Location within Russia
- Coordinates: 56°36′N 42°33′E
- Country: Russia
- Region: Ivanovo Oblast
- District: Pestyakovsky District
- Time zone: UTC+3:00

Khaneyevka (Russian: Ханеевка) is a rural locality (a village) in Pestyakovsky District, Ivanovo Oblast, Russia. Population: 8 (2010 census);

== Geography ==
This rural locality is located 13 kilometres (8.1 mi) from Pestyaki (the district's administrative centre), 106 kilometres (66 mi) from Ivanovo (capital of Ivanovo Oblast) and 317 kilometres (197 mi) from Moscow. Belaya Ramen is the nearest rural locality.
