= Pimanovo =

Pimanovo Пиманово
- Village
- Location within Ivanovo Oblast Location within Russia
- Coordinates: 56°38′N 42°37′E
- Country: Russia
- Region: Ivanovo Oblast
- District: Pestyakovsky District
- Time zone: UTC+3:00

Pimanovo (Russian: Пиманово) is a rural locality (a village) in Pestyakovsky District, Ivanovo Oblast, Russia. Population: 6 (2010 census);

== Geography ==
This rural locality is located 8 kilometres (5.0 mi) from Pestyaki (the district's administrative centre), 108 kilometres (67 mi) from Ivanovo (capital of Ivanovo Oblast) and 321 kilometres (199 mi) from Moscow. Poroshino is the nearest rural locality.
