= Borisovo, Pestyakovsky District, Ivanovo Oblast =

Borisovo Борисово
- Village
- Location within Ivanovo Oblast Location within Russia
- Coordinates: 56°42′N 42°33′E
- Country: Russia
- Region: Ivanovo Oblast
- District: Pestyakovsky District
- Time zone: UTC+3:00

Borisovo (Russian: Борисово) is a rural locality (a village) in Pestyakovsky District, Ivanovo Oblast, Russia. Population: 8 (2010 census);

== Geography ==
This rural locality is located 7 kilometres (4.3 mi) from Pestyaki (the district's administrative centre), 102 kilometres (63 mi) from Ivanovo (capital of Ivanovo Oblast) and 320 kilometres (200 mi) from Moscow. Gomozyata is the nearest rural locality.
