= Vladimir Steklov =

Vladimir Steklov may refer to:

- Vladimir Steklov (mathematician) (1864–1926), Russian mathematician
- Vladimir Steklov (actor) (born 1948), Russian actor
