= Borisovo =

Borisovo may refer to the following places:

- Orekhovo-Borisovo Severnoye District, Moscow, Russia
- Orekhovo-Borisovo Yuzhnoye District, Moscow, Russia
- Borisovo (Moscow Metro), a station of the Moscow Metro, Russia
- Borisovo, Russia, the name of several rural localities in Russia
- Borisovo, Novo Selo, a village in North Macedonia
