= Victor Borisov =

Russian physicist and mathematician

Victor Vasil'evich Borisov
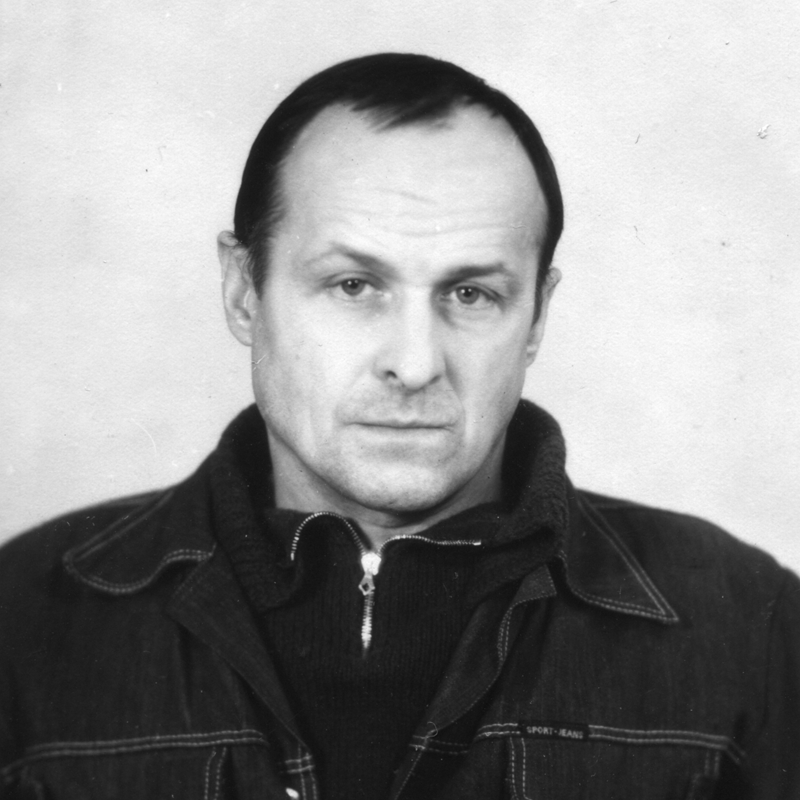
- Born: 31 October 1937; Leningrad, USSR
- Died: 5 December 2013 (aged 76); St. Petersburg, Russia
- Education: St. Petersburg State University
- Known for: Development of foundations of the spacetime triangle diagram (STTD) technique
- Scientific career
- Fields: Physics, Mathematics
- Workplaces: St. Petersburg State University

Victor Vasil'evich Borisov (Russian: Виктор Васильевич Борисов) (31 October 1937 – 5 December 2013) was a Russian physicist and mathematician who contributed to the theory of wave motion, in particular to time domain electromagnetics and localized waves.

Under his guidance, Vladimir Smirnov's approach to solving the initial-boundary value problem to the hyperbolic partial differential equations (in particular, the wave equation) was developed into the spacetime triangle diagram (STTD) technique.

Victor Borisov's findings and ideas are summarized in two monographs edited by Leningrad State University.

== Particular discoveries ==
- 1970s Description of the essentially non-sinusoidal fields emanated by perfectly conducting sources at motion.
- 1980 Transformation of electromagnetic signals at abrupt variation of medium properties, including guiding systems.
- 1993 Characterization of electromagnetic fields accompanying propagation of spike pulses of hard radiation in media.
- 1994 General modal solutions for subluminal and luminal sources distributed on a circle.
- 1994 Physically tenable models of generating finite-support, truncated focus wave modes in free space, noncollisional plasma, and conducting medium.
- 2000 Constructing a new class of relatively undistorted progressing waves.
- 2005 Description of several specific phenomena occurring in waves produced by a travelling source pulse with high-frequency filling.
