= Yangelskoye =

Yangelskoye Янгельское
- Selo
- Location within Bashkortostan Location within Russia
- Coordinates: 53°15′N 58°47′E
- Country: Russia
- Region: Bashkortostan
- District: Abzelilovsky District
- Time zone: UTC+5:00

Yangelskoye (Russian: Янгельское; Bashkir: Йәнгел, Yängel) is a rural locality (a selo) and the administrative center of Yangilsky Selsoviet, Abzelilovsky District, Bashkortostan, Russia. The population was 1,332 as of 2010. There are 30 streets.

== Geography ==
Yangelskoye is located 27 km southeast of Askarovo (the district's administrative centre) by road. Borisovo is the nearest rural locality.
