= Yuri Borisov =

Yuri Borisov may refer to:

- Yura Borisov (born 1992), Russian actor
- Yury Borisov (born 1956), Russian politician, deputy prime minister
- Yury Borisov (scientist) (1923–2006), Soviet-Russian radio scientist
