= Valery Borisov =

Valery Borisov may refer to:

- Valery Borisov (conductor), Russian conductor
- Valery Borisov (politician) (born 1957), Ukrainian politician
- Valeriy Borisov (born 1966), Kazakhstani race walker
