= Aleksandr Borisov =

Aleksandr Borisov may refer to:

- Aleksandr Borisov (actor) (1905–1982), Soviet actor
- Aleksandr Borisov (painter) (1866–1934), Russian painter
- Aleksandr Borisov (politician) (born 1974), Russian politician

== See also ==
- Borisov (disambiguation)
