= Dmitri Borisov =

Dmitri Borisovv may refer to:

- Dmitry Borisov (anchorman) (born 1985), Russian TV and radio personality
- Dmitri Borisov (footballer, born 1977), Russian football player
- Dmitri Borisov (footballer, born 1996), Russian football player
- Dzmitry Barysaw (born 1995), Belarusian football player
