= Vladimir Smirnov (mathematician) =

Russian mathematician (1887–1974)

Vladimir Ivanovich Smirnov
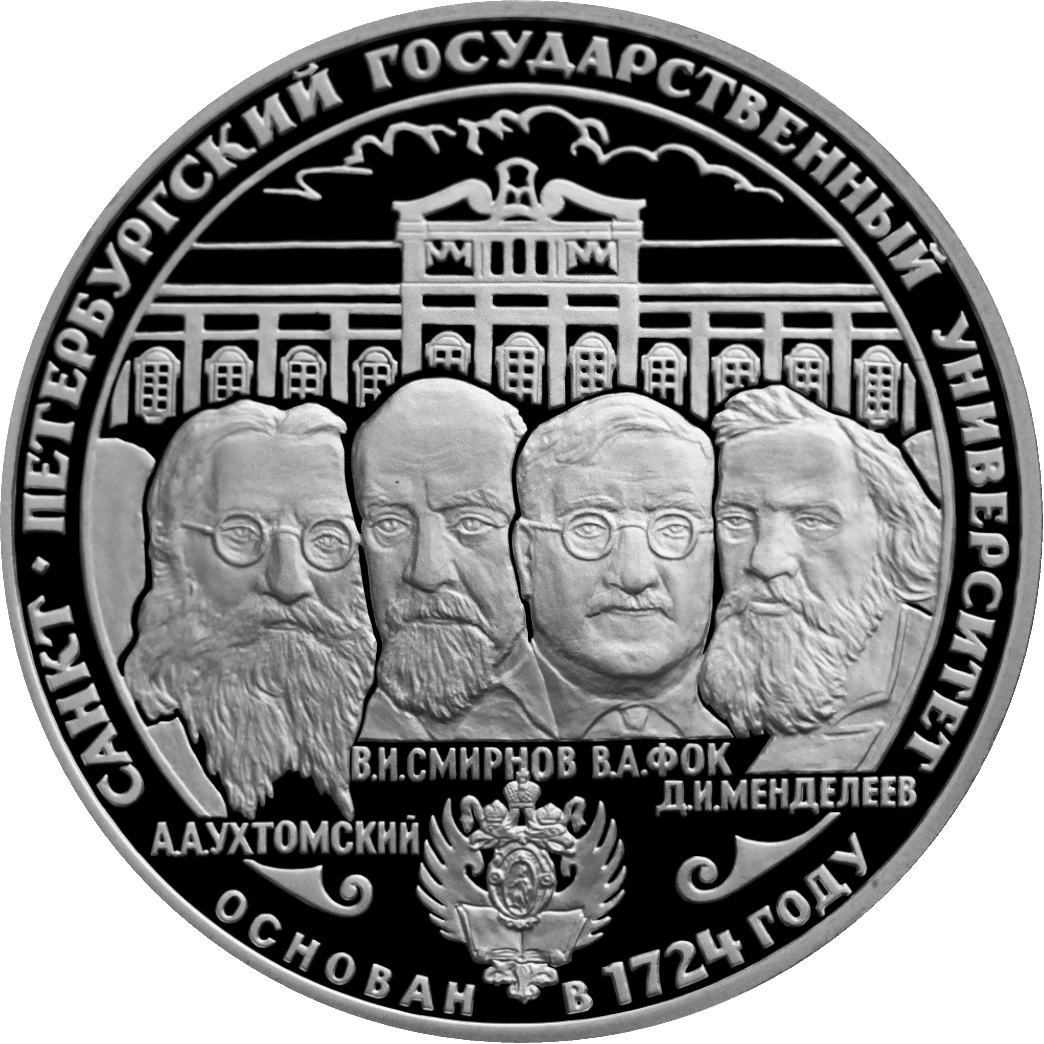
- Vladimir Smirnov (2nd from left) on a Russian commemorative coin (1999).
- Born: 10 June 1887; Saint Petersburg, Russian Empire
- Died: 11 February 1974 (aged 86); Leningrad, USSR
- Education: St. Petersburg State University
- Scientific career
- Fields: Mathematics
- Workplaces: St. Petersburg State University
- Doctoral advisor: Vladimir Steklov
- Doctoral students: Leonid Kantorovich; Solomon Mikhlin; Sergei Sobolev

Vladimir Ivanovich Smirnov (Russian: Влади́мир Ива́нович Смирно́в; 10 June 1887 – 11 February 1974) was a Soviet mathematician who made significant contributions in both pure and applied mathematics, and also in the history of mathematics.

Smirnov worked on diverse areas of mathematics, such as complex functions and conjugate functions in Euclidean spaces. In the applied field his work includes the propagation of waves in elastic media with plane boundaries (with Sergei Sobolev) and the oscillations of elastic spheres. His pioneering approach to solving the initial-boundary value problem to the wave equation formed the basis of the spacetime triangle diagram (STTD) technique for wave motion developed by his follower Victor Borisov (also known as the Smirnov method of incomplete separation of variables).

Smirnov was a Ph.D. student of Vladimir Steklov. Among his notable students were Sergei Sobolev, Solomon Mikhlin and Nobel prize winner Leonid Kantorovich.

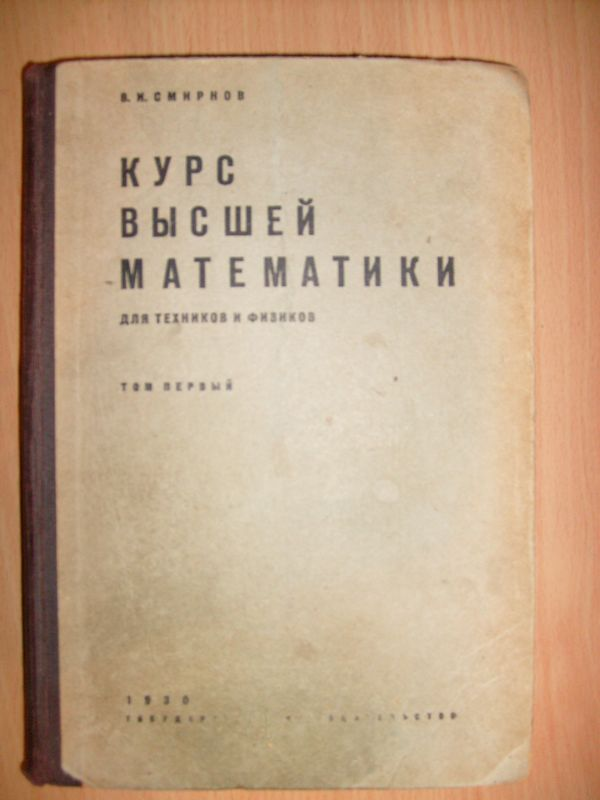
A Course in Higher Mathematics Volume I, 1930

Smirnov is also widely known among students for his five volume series (in seven books) A Course in Higher Mathematics (Курс высшей математики) (the first volume was written jointly with Jacob Tamarkin).
