= Yury Borisov (scientist) =

Yuri Petrovich Borisov
- Born: Yuri Petrovich Borisov; Юрий Петрович Борисов; 1923
- Died: 2006 (aged 82–83); Moscow
- Occupation: specialist in the field of radio engineering

Yuri Petrovich Borisov (Russian: Юрий Петрович Борисов; 1923–2006) was a Russian scientist and a specialist in the field of radio engineering. Professor Borisov was Doctor of Technical Sciences, and Dean of the Radio Technical Faculty of Moscow Power Engineering Institute between 1980 and 1987. Laureate of USSR State Prize (1986).

== Biography ==
Yuri Petrovich Borisov was born on 1 September 1923. In 1949 he graduated from the Radio Engineering Faculty of Moscow Power Engineering Institute. In 1953 he defended his thesis. From 1980 to 1987 he was the Dean of the Radio Technical Faculty of MPEI, in 1980—1990 he was in charge of the Department of Radio Engineering Systems of the Institute. Professor (1984).

Together with Lev Gutkin he was the founder of the Department of Radio Engineering Systems of MPEI, which was formed in 1961 and headed by Professor Gutkin. Yuri Petrovich gave lectures on such disciplines as "Fundamentals of radio control", "The use of computers in the study and design of radio systems"; he also was one of the authors of the monograph "Radio control of rockets and space vehicles, published in 1968. In 1967, he wrote a textbook "Fundamentals of Multichannel Information Transmission."

Borisov was a specialist in the field of analog and digital modeling of radio systems and radio devices and researched optimization of radio systems characteristics. His scientific work was resulted in the manual called "Mathematical modeling of radio systems" (1975).

In 1986 he was awarded USSR State Prize "for the great contribution to the creation and development of the statistical theory of radio systems".
