= Vladislav Borisov =

Vladislav Borisov may refer to:

- Vladislav Borisov (cyclist) (born 1978), Russian cyclist
- Vladislav Borisov (gymnast) (born 1991), Bulgarian acrobatic gymnast
