= Boris Borisov =

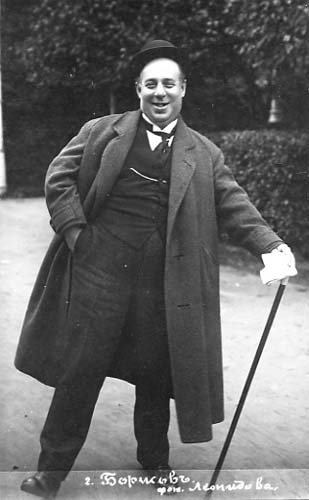
- Born: Boris Borisov; 1872
- Died: 1939 (aged 66–67)
- Occupation: Actor
- Years active: 1908–1918

Boris Borisov (Russian: Борис Борисов) was a Russian actor. Honored Artist of the RSFSR.

== Selected filmography ==
- 1911 – Defence of Sevastopol
- 1915 – Leon Drey
