= Dmitri Borisov (footballer, born 1996) =

Russian footballer

Personal information
- Full name: Dmitri Igorevich Borisov
- Date of birth: 8 November 1996 (age 29)
- Place of birth: Saratov, Russia
- Height: 1.74 m (5 ft 9 in)
- Position: Midfielder

Youth career
- 2012–2015: FC Sokol Saratov

Senior career*
Years	Team	Apps	(Gls)
2015–2022	FC Sokol Saratov	103	(3)
2016–2017	→ FC Dynamo Kirov (loan)	16	(0)
- * Club domestic league appearances and goals

Dmitri Igorevich Borisov (Russian: Дмитрий Игоревич Борисов; born 8 November 1996) is a Russian former football player.

== Club career ==
He made his debut in the Russian Football National League for FC Sokol Saratov on 23 August 2015 in a game against FC KAMAZ Naberezhnye Chelny.
