= Valery Borisov (conductor) =

Russian choral conductor

Valery Borisov is a Russian conductor and two time recipient of the Zolotoy Sofit.

== Conductor ==
Vladimir Borisov was born in Leningrad (now Saint Petersburg) and finished choir college of the Glinka Academic Capella in 1968. He was a graduate of the Saint Petersburg Conservatory and by 1973 became faculty of choral conducting there following by becoming a conductor of its opera and symphony five years later. From 1976 to 1986 he worked at Glinka Academic Capella and two years later became a chief choir master of the Mariinsky Theatre where he also worked as a conductor till 2000. He have published over 70 works which genres range from opera to symphony and even cantata-oratorio.

Since 1996 Valery was a professor at the Saint Petersburg Conservatory and then worked at the Mariinsky Theatre under guidance from Valery Gergiev. In April 2003 he became choir master of the Bolshoi Theatre where he directed chorus in such operas as Tchaikovsky's Eugene Onegin, Mazeppa and The Queen of Spades which were chosen by him in 2004. Besides those operas he also did Rimsky-Korsakov's works such as The Snow Maiden and The Legend of the Invisible City and Prokofiev's The Fiery Angel and War and Peace.

He also was a chorus conductor of the Giuseppe Verdi's works such as the Falstaff and Macbeth as well as Bizet's Carmen, berg's Wozzeck and Mikhail Glinka's Ruslan and Lyudmila among other works. In 2005 the chorus of Bolshoi Theatre had claimed the Golden Mask award for the performance of operas Macbeth and The Flying Dutchman.
