= Borisovo, Republic of Bashkortostan =

Borisovo Борисово
- Village
- Location within Bashkortostan Location within Russia
- Coordinates: 53°16′11″N 58°47′31″E
- Country: Russia
- Region: Bashkortostan
- District: Abzelilovsky District
- Time zone: UTC+5:00

Borisovo (Russian: Борисово; Bashkir: Борисов, Borisov) is a rural locality (a village) in Gusevsky Selsoviet, Abzelilovsky District, Bashkortostan, Russia. The population was 60 as of 2010.

== Geography ==
Borisovo is located 33 km southeast of Askarovo (the district's administrative centre) by road. Yangelskoye is the nearest rural locality.
