= Andrey Borisov =

Russian blogger and actor (born 1990)

- Born: Andrey Andreevich Ivanov; May 13, 1990 (age 35); Vitebsk, Byelorussian SSR, Soviet Union
- Other names: GAN13
- Occupations: Blogger; Actor

YouTube information
- Channel: GAN_13_
- Years active: since 2016
- Genre: Vine
- Subscribers: 5.38 million
- Views: 2 billion
- Last updated: 2 September 2024

Andrey Borisov (born May 13, 1990, in Vitebsk) is a Russian YouTuber, blogger and actor.

== Biography ==
Andrey was born May 13, 1990, in Vitebsk. Later he moved to Moscow, where he graduated school in 2005 and entered College of arts and crafts No. 59 as a cabinetmaker-carpenter, then he switched his specialization to become an artist of decorative and applied arts. In 2010 he entered the Circus college but left it in a year.

In 2011 he entered All-Russian State Institute of Cinematography named after S. Gerasimov and graduated in 2015 as an actor. He currently resides in Dayton, Ohio.

== Career ==
From 2013 to 2014 he played in the Theatre of Nations the role of stripper and gang leader in the play "Jeanne" (Russian:"Жанна").

In 2014, he starred in the short film «Legacy» (Russian:"Наследство") with Veniamin Smekhov.

Awarded the third prize of the Y. M. Smolensky recitation competition (2014). Since 2014, he has been an actor at the "Et cetera" theatre. Since 2015 plays the role of Nikolai Chekhov in the play "Your Chekhov" (Russian:"Ваш Чехов").

In July 2016, Andrey became an Instagram blogger. Currently, the number of his subscribers exceeded 3,1 million on the main profile and 741 thousand on the additional.

On August 28, 2016, he opened a YouTube channel. At the end of 2017, Andrey began filming the joint vines with actress Lily Abramova, who played the role of his mother. Olga Antipova and Marina Fedunkiv also periodically appeared in their videos. Currently, the channel's audience exceeds 1.6 million subscribers.

In 2017, he starred in the music video of singer Emma M "Beautiful Life".

Also Andrey was the invited participant of various TV shows such as "Let Them Talk" (Russian: "Пусть говорят") on the "Channel One Russia" (Russian: "Первый канал") and "Little Friday" on "Humor Box" channel (Russian: "Юмор Box").

Was nominated for "Lady Mail.Ru" "the Best bloggers 2017 by the readers" in the category "True vine". Also in 2017 he received the award "Blogger of the year" according to the club ICON.

== Theatrical roles ==
The Theatre of Nations

- 2013—2014 — "Jeanne" (Russian:"Жанна") — gang leader

«Et cetera» theater

- 2015—2018 — Your Chekhov" (Russian:"Ваш Чехов") — Nikolai Chekhov

== Filmography ==
- 2014 — The Dark World: Equilibrium (Russian:Тёмный мир: Равновесие) — Iraklyi the chemistrist (Episode 1)
- 2014 — Blind (Russian:Слепая) — plumber Kolya (Season 1, Episode 27)
- 2014 — Legacy (Russian:Наследство) (short film)

== Links ==
- Andrey Borisov's channel on YouTube
- Andrey Borisov on Instagram
