= Borisovo, Amur Oblast =

Borisovo Борисово
- Selo
- Location within Amur Oblast Location within Russia
- Coordinates: 50°24′N 129°13′E
- Country: Russia
- Region: Amur Oblast
- District: Oktyabrsky District
- Time zone: UTC+9:00

Borisovo (Russian: Борисово) is a rural locality (a selo) in Romanovsky Selsoviet of Oktyabrsky District, Amur Oblast, Russia. The population was 1 as of 2018. There is 1 street.

== Geography ==
Borisovo is located 14 km northeast of Yekaterinoslavka (the district's administrative centre) by road. Pribrezhny is the nearest rural locality.
