= Sanya Borisova =

Bulgarian actress

Sanya Borisova-Ilieva
- Born: 9 March 1983 (age 43); Vidin, Bulgaria

Sanya Borisova-Ilieva (Bulgarian: Саня Борисова-Илиева, born 9 March 1983) is a Bulgarian actress.

== Career ==
She had major roles in the films "The Foreigner" (Bulgarian: "Чужденецът") and "Living Legends" (Bulgarian: "Живи легенди"). She also co-starred alongside Gary Dourdan in the 2018 Bulgarian film All She Wrote. In addition to acting, Borisova has been active in behind the stage roles such as preparing costumes for films.

She appeared on the cover of the Bulgarian edition of Maxim in April 2012.

She married actor and director Nikolay Iliev in 2012. The couple divorced in 2018.
