= Borisovo, Muromsky District, Vladimir Oblast =

Borisovo Борисово
- Selo
- Location within Vladimir Oblast Location within Russia
- Coordinates: 55°40′N 42°03′E
- Country: Russia
- Region: Vladimir Oblast
- District: Muromsky District
- Time zone: UTC+3:00

Borisovo (Russian: Бори́сово) is a rural locality (a selo) in Borisoglebskoye Rural Settlement, Muromsky District, Vladimir Oblast, Russia. The population was 475 as of 2010. There are 11 streets.

== Geography ==
Borisovo is located 14 km north of Murom (the district's administrative centre) by road. Chaadayevo is the nearest rural locality.
