= Borisova, Perm Krai =

Borisova Борисова
- Village
- Location within Perm Krai Location within Russia
- Coordinates: 58°56′N 54°32′E
- Country: Russia
- Region: Perm Krai
- District: Kudymkarsky District
- Time zone: UTC+5:00

Borisova (Russian: Борисова) is a rural locality (a village) in Stepanovskoye Rural Settlement, Kudymkarsky District, Perm Krai, Russia. The population was 51 as of 2010.

== Geography ==
Borisova is located 14 km southwest of Kudymkar (the district's administrative centre) by road. Sofonkova is the nearest rural locality.
