= Borisovo, Vozhegodsky District, Vologda Oblast =

Borisovo Борисово
- Village
- Location within Vologda Oblast Location within Russia
- Coordinates: 60°23′N 39°17′E
- Country: Russia
- Region: Vologda Oblast
- District: Vozhegodsky District
- Time zone: UTC+3:00

Borisovo (Russian: Борисово) is a rural locality (a village) in Beketovskoye Rural Settlement, Vozhegodsky District, Vologda Oblast, Russia. The population was 46 as of 2002.

== Geography ==
Borisovo is located 70 km southwest of Vozhega (the district's administrative centre) by road. Ivankovo is the nearest rural locality.
