= Borisovo (Grigoryevskoye Rural Settlement), Gus-Khrustalny District, Vladimir Oblast =

Borisovo Борисово
- Village
- Location within Vladimir Oblast Location within Russia
- Coordinates: 55°31′N 40°56′E
- Country: Russia
- Region: Vladimir Oblast
- District: Gus-Khrustalny District
- Time zone: UTC+3:00

Borisovo (Russian: Бори́сово) is a rural locality (a village) in Grigoryevskoye Rural Settlement, Gus-Khrustalny District, Vladimir Oblast, Russia. The population was 3 as of 2010.

== Geography ==
The village is located 4 km north from Grigoryevo, 22 km south-east from Gus-Khrustalny.
