= Borisovo (Zolotkovo Rural Settlement), Gus-Khrustalny District, Vladimir Oblast =

Borisovo Борисово
- Village
- Location within Vladimir Oblast Location within Russia
- Coordinates: 55°34′N 41°14′E
- Country: Russia
- Region: Vladimir Oblast
- District: Gus-Khrustalny District
- Time zone: UTC+3:00

Borisovo (Russian: Бори́сово) is a rural locality (a village) in Posyolok Zolotkovo, Gus-Khrustalny District, Vladimir Oblast, Russia. The population was 10 as of 2010.

== Geography ==
The village is located 15 km north-east from Zolotkovo, 39 km east from Gus-Khrustalny.
