= Borisovo, Sokolsky District, Vologda Oblast =

Borisovo Борисово
- Village
- Location within Vologda Oblast Location within Russia
- Coordinates: 59°37′N 41°13′E
- Country: Russia
- Region: Vologda Oblast
- District: Sokolsky District
- Time zone: UTC+3:00

Borisovo (Russian: Борисово) is a rural locality (a village) in Chuchkovskoye Rural Settlement, Sokolsky District, Vologda Oblast, Russia. The population was 15 as of 2002.

== Geography ==
Borisovo is located 85 km northeast of Sokol (the district's administrative centre) by road. Starovo is the nearest rural locality.
