= Maxim Borisov =

Russian ITHF table hockey player

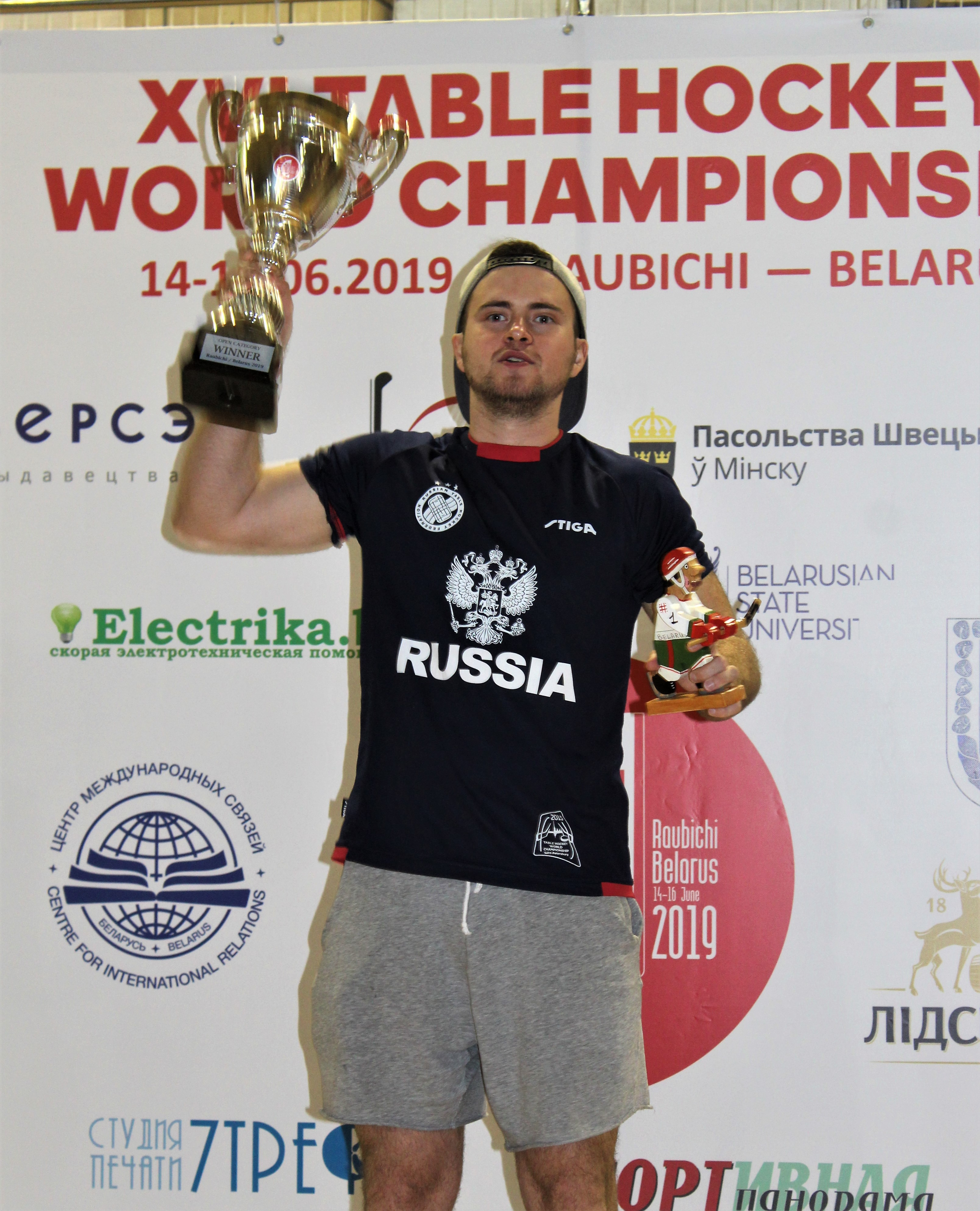
- Maxim Borisov in 2019.

Personal information
- Native name: Maxim Borisov
- Nationality: Russia
- Citizenship: Russia
- Born: 1995 (age 30–31)
- Home town: St. Petersburg
- Occupation: table hockey player
- Years active: 2003-

Sport
- Country: Russia
- Sport: table hockey
- Rank: 1.
- Club: Legion

Achievements and titles
- Highest world ranking: 1.

Maxim Borisov (born 1995) is a Russian ITHF table hockey player. He is a double world champion.

He is also a professional FIFA player known as ZaykaPoehali. He finished second in 2022 Russian national championship.
