= Borisovo, Kaduysky District, Vologda Oblast =

Borisovo Борисово
- Village
- Location within Vologda Oblast Location within Russia
- Coordinates: 59°25′N 37°13′E
- Country: Russia
- Region: Vologda Oblast
- District: Kaduysky District
- Time zone: UTC+3:00

Borisovo (Russian: Борисово) is a rural locality (a village) in Nikolskoye Rural Settlement, Kaduysky District, Vologda Oblast, Russia. The population was 2 as of 2002.

== Geography ==
Borisovo is located 38 km north of Kaduy (the district's administrative centre) by road. Posobkovo is the nearest rural locality.
