= Sergey Borisov =

Sergey or Sergei Borisov may refer to:

- Sergei Borisov (ice hockey) (born 1985), Russian ice hockey player
- Sergey Borisov (cyclist) (born 1983), Russian cyclist
- Sergey Borisov (footballer, born 1972), Russian footballer with FC Torpedo Moscow
