= Borisov, Volgograd Oblast =

Borisov Борисов
- Khutor
- Location within Volgograd Oblast Location within Russia
- Coordinates: 48°53′N 42°55′E
- Country: Russia
- Region: Volgograd Oblast
- District: Kletsky District
- Time zone: UTC+4:00

Borisov (Russian: Борисов) is a rural locality (a khutor) in Manoylinskoye Rural Settlement, Kletsky District, Volgograd Oblast, Russia. The population was 93 as of 2010.

== Geography ==
Borisov is located 90 km south of Kletskaya (the district's administrative centre) by road. Dobrinka is the nearest rural locality.
