= Borisovo, Vashkinsky District, Vologda Oblast =

Borisovo Борисово
- Village
- Location within Vologda Oblast Location within Russia
- Coordinates: 60°31′N 38°06′E
- Country: Russia
- Region: Vologda Oblast
- District: Vashkinsky District
- Time zone: UTC+3:00

Borisovo (Russian: Борисово) is a rural locality (a village) in Andreyevskoye Rural Settlement, Vashkinsky District, Vologda Oblast, Russia. The population was 4 as of 2002.

== Geography ==
Borisovo is located 40 km northeast of Lipin Bor (the district's administrative centre) by road. Popovka-Pushtorskaya is the nearest rural locality.
