= Ivan Borisov =

Ivan Borisov may refer to:

- Ivan Borisov (alpine skier) (born 1979), Kyrgyzstani alpine skier
- Ivan Dmitriyevich Borisov (1913–1939), Soviet Winter War pilot and Hero of the Soviet Union
- Ivan Grigorevich Borisov (1921–1954), Soviet World War II fighter pilot and Hero of the Soviet Union
