= Vladimir Steklov (mathematician) =

Russian mathematician (1864–1926)

Vladimir A. Steklov
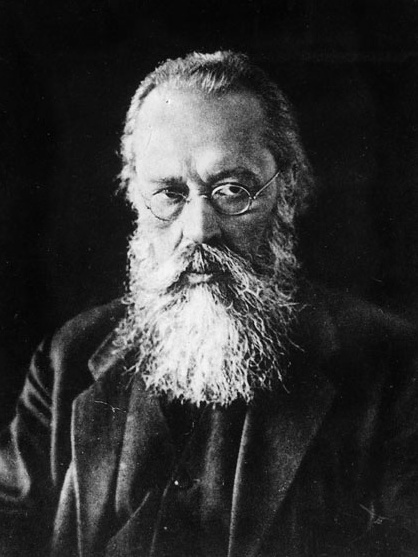
- Born: 9 January 1864; Nizhny Novgorod, Russian Empire
- Died: 30 May 1926 (aged 62); Gaspra, Crimea, Soviet Union
- Education: Kharkov University
- Known for: Poincaré–Steklov operator
- Scientific career
- Fields: Applied mathematics
- Workplaces: Kharkov University
- Doctoral advisor: Aleksandr Lyapunov
- Doctoral students: Vladimir Smirnov

Vladimir Andreevich Steklov (Russian: Влади́мир Андре́евич Стекло́в; 9 January 1864 – 30 May 1926) was a prominent Russian and Soviet mathematician, mechanician and physicist.

== Biography ==
Steklov was born in Nizhny Novgorod, Russia. In 1887 he graduated from the Kharkov University, where he was a student of Aleksandr Lyapunov.

In 1889–1906 he worked at the Department of Mechanics of this university. He became a full professor in 1896. During 1893–1905 he also taught theoretical mechanics in the Kharkov Polytechnical Institute (now known as Kharkiv Polytechnic Institute). In 1906 he started working at Petersburg University.

In 1921 he petitioned for the creation of the Institute of Physics and Mathematics. Upon his death, the institute was named after him. The Mathematics Department split from the Institute in 1934. It is now known as Steklov Institute of Mathematics. A lunar impact crater is also named after him.

Steklov wrote a number of works on the history of science. He was an Invited Speaker of the ICM in 1924 in Toronto.

In 1926 he was elected a corresponding member of the Göttingen Academy of Sciences and Humanities.

Steklov died in Gaspra, Crimea, USSR. He was interred in Saint Petersburg, Russia.
