= Borislav Borisov =

Borislav Borisov may refer to:

- Borislav Borisov (canoeist) (born 1954), Bulgarian sprint canoer
- Borislav Borisov (footballer) (born 1990), Bulgarian footballer
- Borislav Borisov (gymnast) (born 1994), Bulgarian acrobatic gymnast
