= Roman Borisov =

Russian footballer

Personal information
- Full name: Roman Viktorovich Borisov
- Date of birth: 4 August 1981 (age 45)
- Place of birth: Sochi, Russian SFSR
- Height: 1.82 m (6 ft 0 in)
- Positions: Defender; midfielder

Senior career*
Years	Team	Apps	(Gls)
1998	FC Zhemchuzhina-2 Sochi	24	(0)
1999	FC Baltika Kaliningrad	0	(0)
1999	FC SKA Rostov-on-Don	0	(0)
2000	FC Neftyanik Yaroslavl	26	(1)
2001–2002	FC Zhemchuzhina Sochi	38	(0)
2004	FC Reutov	12	(0)
2005	FC Avangard Kursk	2	(0)
2005	FC Sochi-04	8	(0)
2006	FC Gazovik Orenburg	23	(2)
2007	FC Spartak Kostroma	22	(0)
2008	FC Sochi-04	8	(0)
2008	FC Lada Togliatti	20	(0)
2009	FC Nara-ShBFR Naro-Fominsk	10	(0)
- * Club domestic league appearances and goals

Roman Viktorovich Borisov (Russian: Роман Викторович Борисов; born 4 August 1981) is a former Russian professional football player.

== Club career ==
He played in the Russian Football National League for FC Avangard Kursk in 2005.
