= Borisovo, Altai Krai =

Borisovo Борисово
- Selo
- Location within Altai Krai Location within Russia
- Coordinates: 54°02′N 85°00′E
- Country: Russia
- Region: Altai Krai
- District: Zalesovsky District
- Time zone: UTC+7:00

Borisovo (Russian: Борисово) is a rural locality (a selo) and the administrative center of Borisovsky Selsoviet, Zalesovsky District, Altai Krai, Russia. The population was 699 as of 2013. There are 10 streets.

== Geography ==
Borisovo is located 20 km southwest of Zalesovo (the district's administrative centre) by road. Nikolsky is the nearest rural locality.
