= Pestyaki =

Urban locality in Ivanovo Oblast, Russia

Pestyaki Пестяки
- Urban-type settlement
- Interactive map of Pestyaki
- Location of Pestyaki Pestyaki (Ivanovo Oblast)
- Coordinates: 56°42′24″N 42°40′08″E
- Country: Russia
- Federal subject: Ivanovo Oblast
- Administrative district: Pestyakovsky District

Population (2010 Census)
  - Total: 4,028
  - Estimate (2025): 2,925 (−27.4%)
- Time zone: UTC+3 (MSK)
- Postal code: 155650
- OKTMO ID: 24619151051

Pestyaki (Russian: Пестяки́) is an urban-type settlement and the administrative center of Pestyakovsky District, Ivanovo Oblast, Russia. Population: 3,097 (2021 census); 4,028 (2010 census); 4,319 (2002 census); 4,903 (1989 Soviet census).

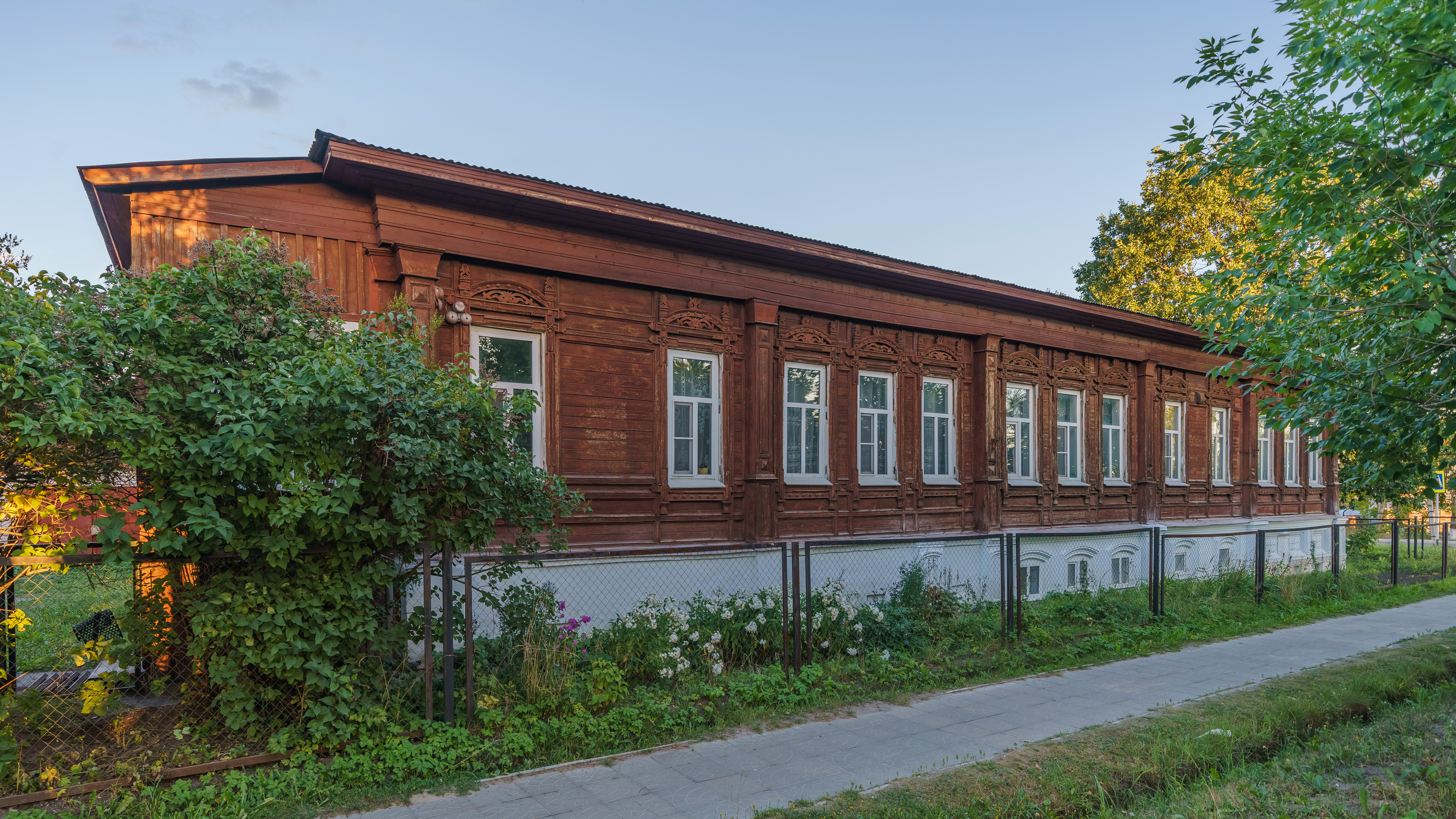
A wooden house in Pestyaki

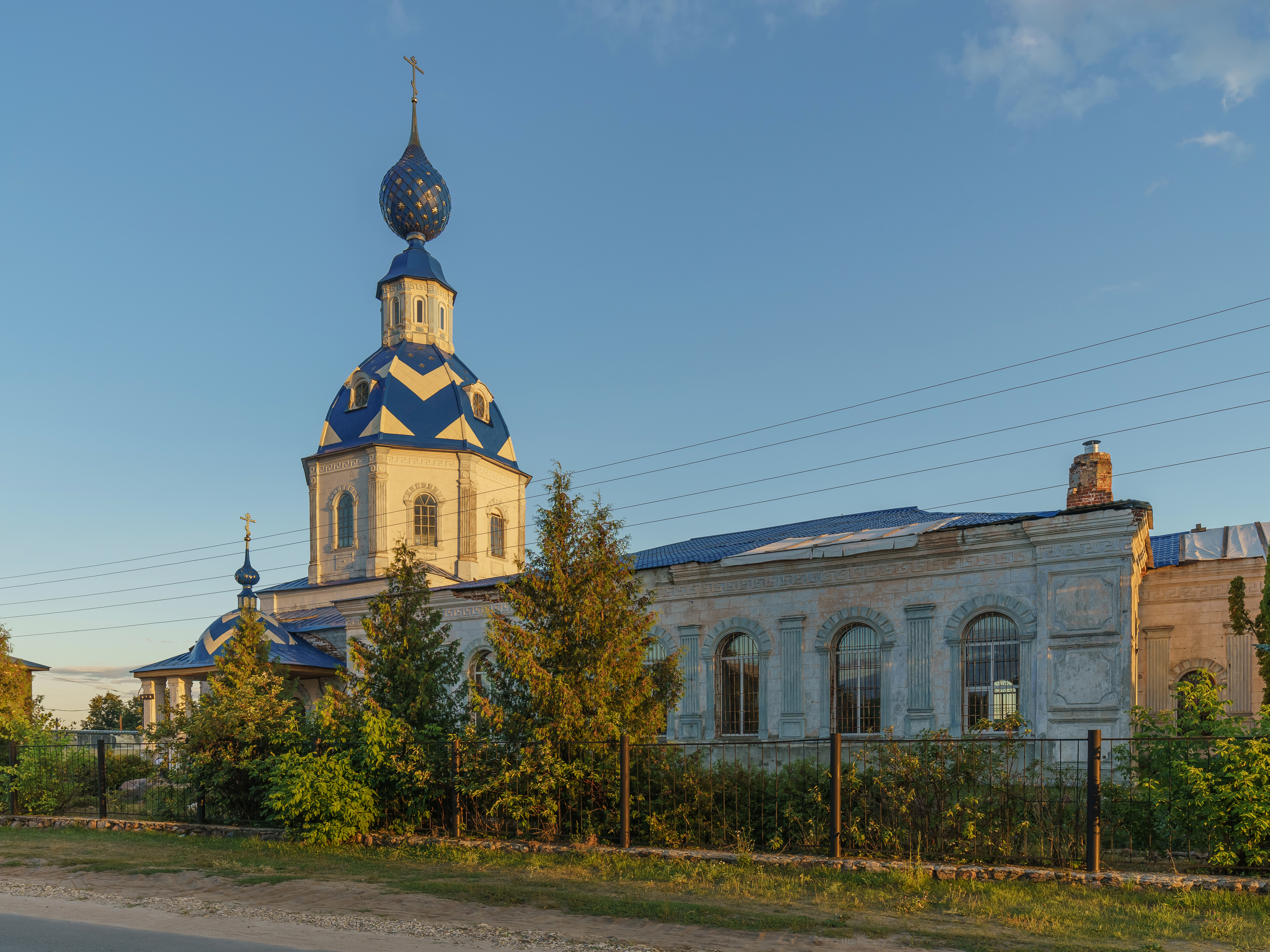
Assumption Church

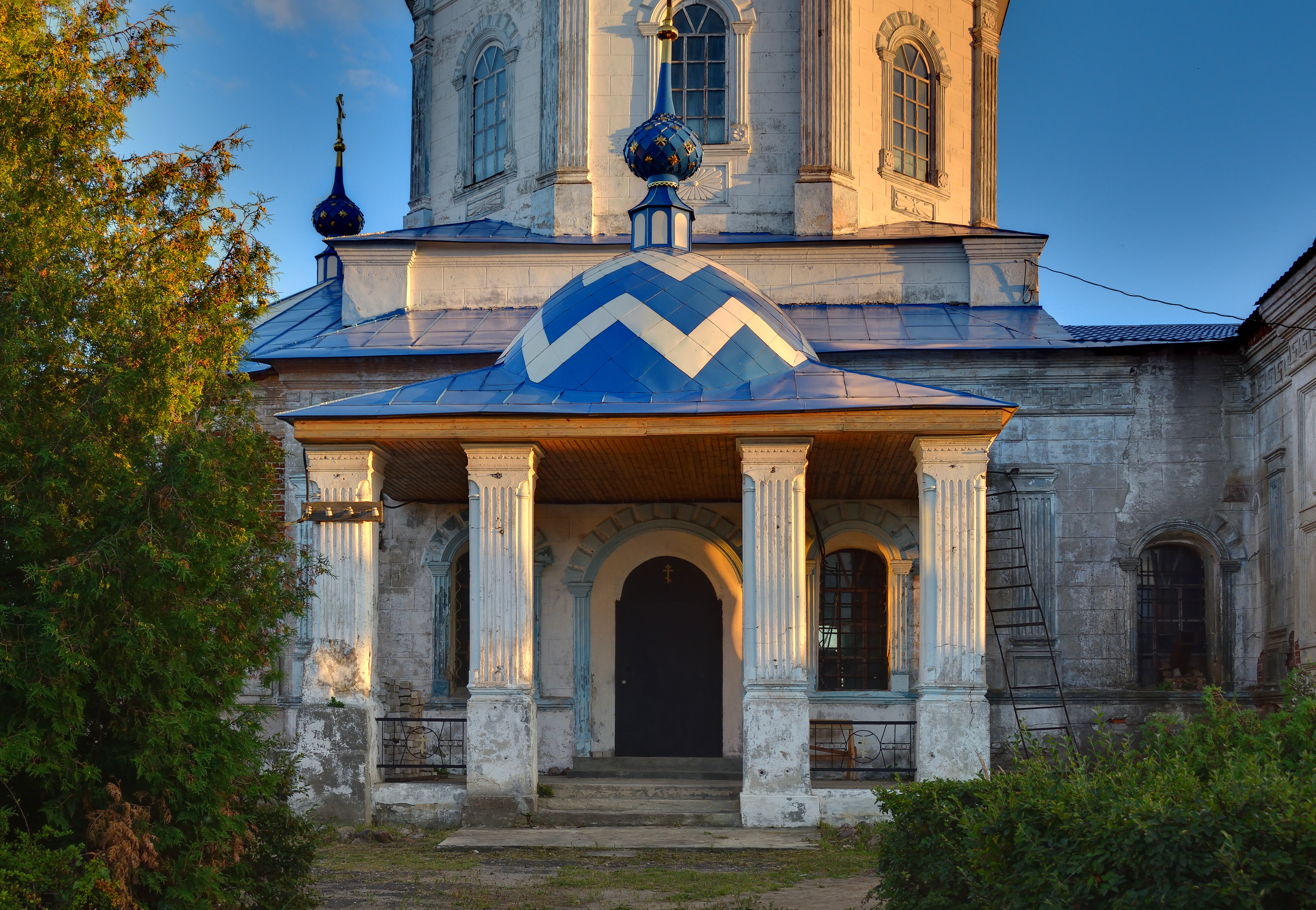
Assumption Church, portal

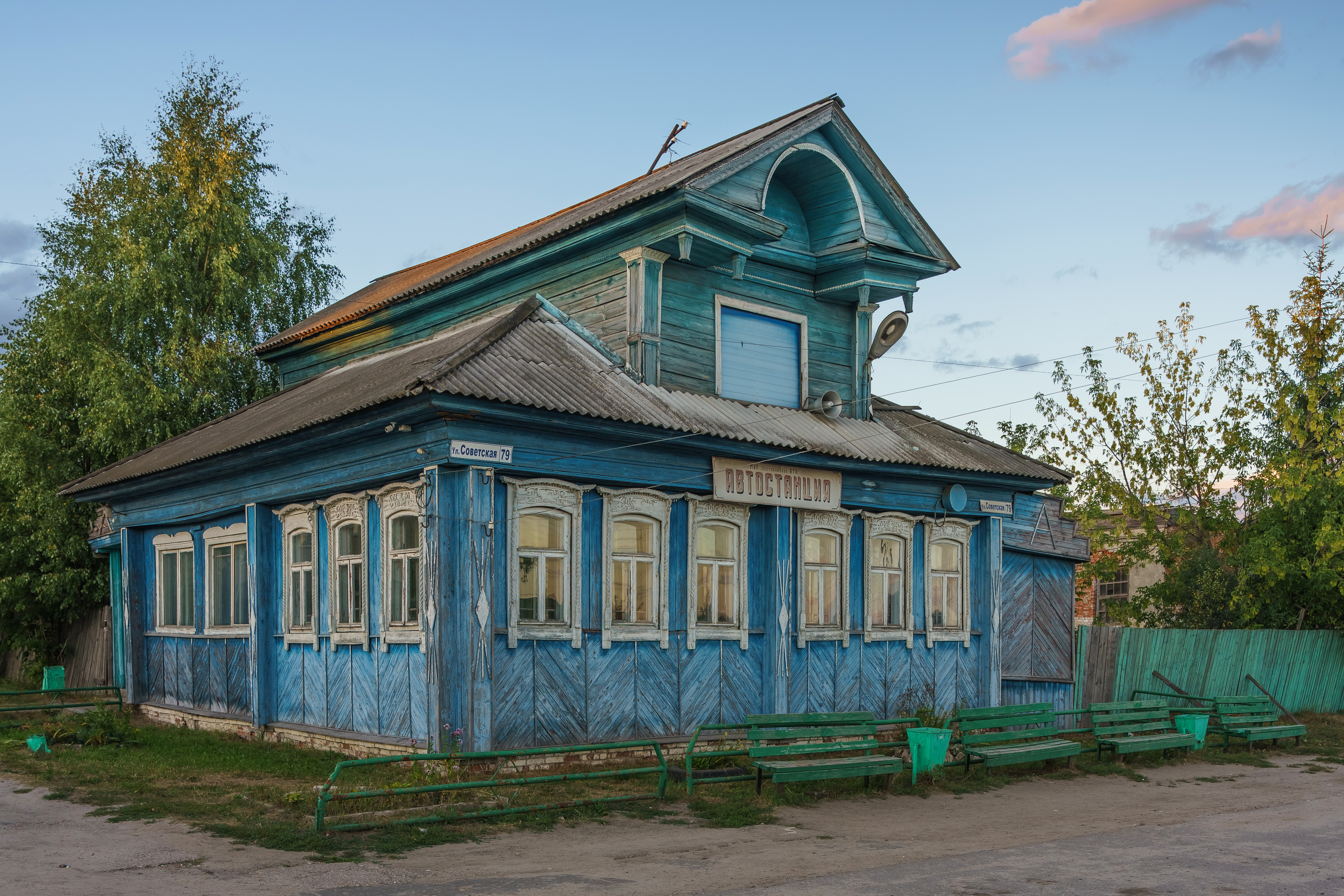
Pestyaki bus station
