= Pestyakovsky District =

Pestyakovsky District Пестяковский район (Russian)
- District
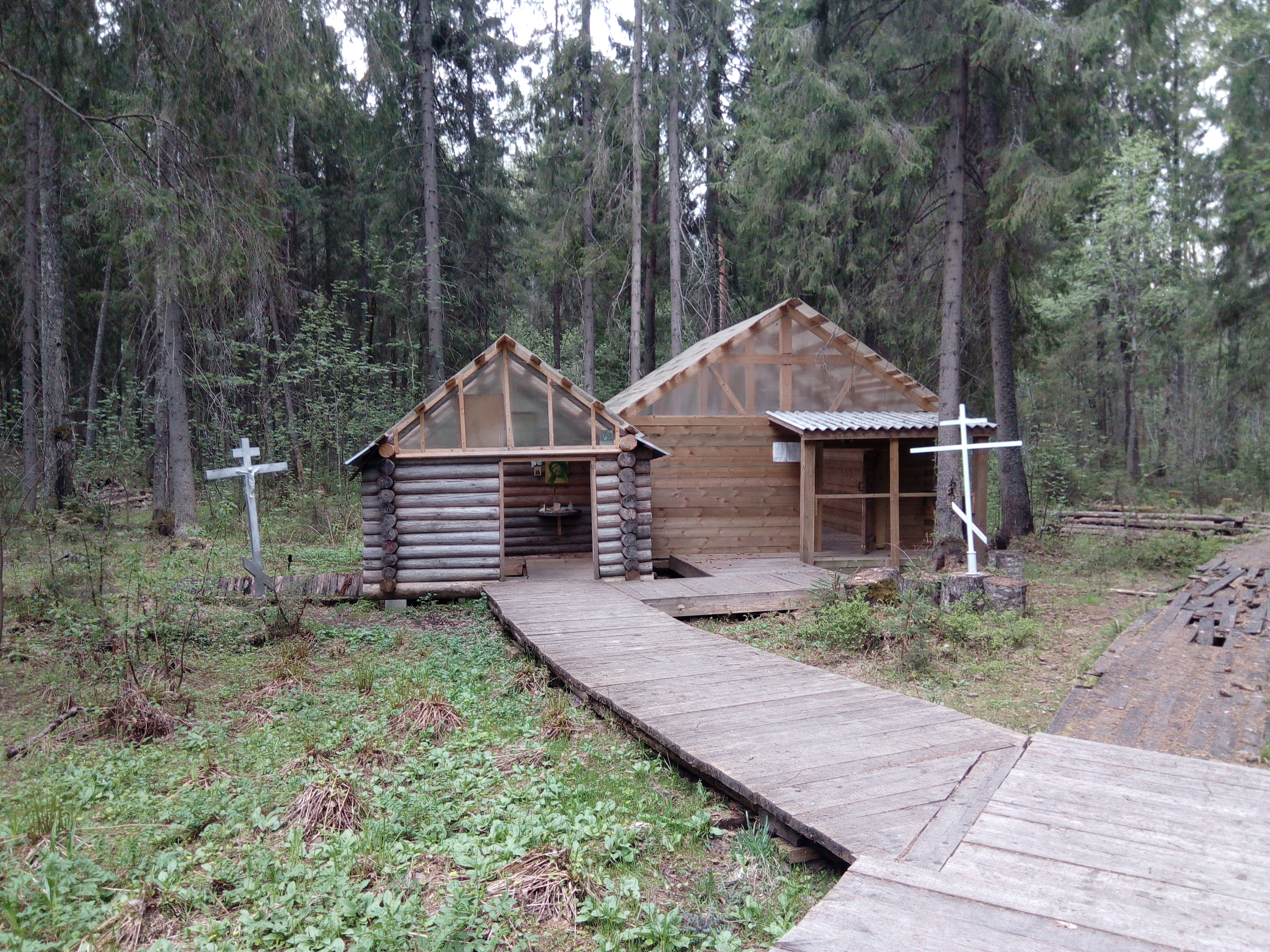
- Near the village of Lukanino, Pestyakovsky District

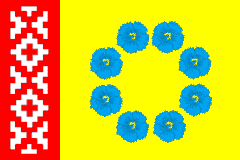
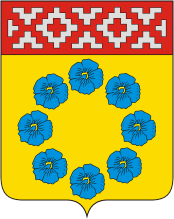
- Flag Coat of arms
- Location of Pestyakovsky District in Ivanovo Oblast
- Coordinates: 56°43′N 42°40′E
- Country: Russia
- Federal subject: Ivanovo Oblast
- Administrative center: Pestyaki

Area
  - Total: 1,100 km^{2} (420 sq mi)

Population (2010 Census)
  - Total: 7,160
  - Density: 6.5/km^{2} (17/sq mi)
  - Urban: 56.3%
  - Rural: 43.7%

Administrative structure
  - Inhabited localities: 132 rural localities

Municipal structure
  - Municipally incorporated as: Pestyakovsky Municipal District
  - Municipal divisions: 1 urban settlements, 2 rural settlements
- Time zone: UTC+3 (MSK)
- OKTMO ID: 24619000
- Website: http://www.pestyaki.ru

Pestyakovsky District (Russian: Пестяковский райо́н) is an administrative and municipal district (raion), one of the twenty-one in Ivanovo Oblast, Russia. It is located in the southeast of the oblast. The area of the district is 1,100 square kilometers (420 sq mi). Its administrative center is the urban locality (a settlement) of Pestyaki. Population: 5,015 (2021 census); 7,160 (2010 census); 8,629 (2002 Census); 9,660 (1989 Soviet census). The population of Pestyaki accounts for 61.8% of the district's total population.
