= Voskhod, Russia =

Voskhod (Russian: Восхо́д) is the name of several rural localities in Russia.

== Altai Krai ==
As of 2010, four rural localities in Altai Krai bear this name:

- Voskhod, Khabarsky District, Altai Krai, a settlement in Martovsky Selsoviet of Khabarsky District
- Voskhod, Kosikhinsky District, Altai Krai, a settlement in Bayunovsky Selsoviet of Kosikhinsky District
- Voskhod, Zalesovsky District, Altai Krai, a selo in Cheremushkinsky Selsoviet of Zalesovsky District
- Voskhod, Zonalny District, Altai Krai, a settlement in Pleshkovsky Selsoviet of Zonalny District

== Republic of Bashkortostan ==
As of 2010, two rural localities in the Republic of Bashkortostan bear this name:

- Voskhod, Belokataysky District, Republic of Bashkortostan, a village in Tardavsky Selsoviet of Belokataysky District
- Voskhod, Mishkinsky District, Republic of Bashkortostan, a village in Mishkinsky Selsoviet of Mishkinsky District

== Chechen Republic ==
As of 2010, one rural locality in the Chechen Republic bears this name:

- Voskhod, Chechen Republic, a settlement in Shelkovskoy District

== Chelyabinsk Oblast ==
As of 2010, one rural locality in Chelyabinsk Oblast bears this name:

- Voskhod, Chelyabinsk Oblast, a settlement in Belokamensky Selsoviet of Bredinsky District

== Chuvash Republic ==
As of 2010, one rural locality in the Chuvash Republic bears this name:

- Voskhod, Chuvash Republic, a settlement in Voskhodskoye Rural Settlement of Alatyrsky District

== Republic of Kalmykia ==
As of 2010, one rural locality in the Republic of Kalmykia bears this name:

- Voskhod, Republic of Kalmykia, a settlement in Voskhodovskaya Rural Administration of Oktyabrsky District

== Kaluga Oblast ==
As of 1965, one rural locality in Kaluga Oblast bears this name:

- Voskhod, Kaluga Oblast, a settlement in Voskhod Rural Territory of Zhukovsky District

== Kemerovo Oblast ==
As of 2010, one rural locality in Kemerovo Oblast bears this name:

- Voskhod, Kemerovo Oblast, a settlement in Plotnikovskaya Rural Territory of Promyshlennovsky District

== Khabarovsk Krai ==
As of 2010, one rural locality in Khabarovsk Krai bears this name:

- Voskhod, Khabarovsk Krai, a selo in Khabarovsky District

== Krasnodar Krai ==
As of 2010, two rural localities in Krasnodar Krai bear this name:

- Voskhod, Novokubansky District, Krasnodar Krai, a settlement in Kovalevsky Rural Okrug of Novokubansky District
- Voskhod, Novopokrovsky District, Krasnodar Krai, a settlement in Pokrovsky Rural Okrug of Novopokrovsky District

== Kurgan Oblast ==
As of 2010, one rural locality in Kurgan Oblast bears this name:

- Voskhod, Kurgan Oblast, a selo in Voskhodsky Selsoviet of Mishkinsky District

== Republic of Mordovia ==
As of 2010, one rural locality in the Republic of Mordovia bears this name:

- Voskhod, Republic of Mordovia, a settlement in Voskhodsky Selsoviet of Staroshaygovsky District

== Moscow Oblast ==
As of 2010, one rural locality in Moscow Oblast bears this name:

- Voskhod, Moscow Oblast, a settlement within the closed administrative-territorial formation of the same name

== Nizhny Novgorod Oblast ==
As of 2010, three rural localities in Nizhny Novgorod Oblast bear this name:

- Voskhod, Bor, Nizhny Novgorod Oblast, a settlement in Pamyat Parizhskoy Kommuny Selsoviet of the city of oblast significance of Bor
- Voskhod, Lyskovsky District, Nizhny Novgorod Oblast, a settlement in Berendeyevsky Selsoviet of Lyskovsky District
- Voskhod, Varnavinsky District, Nizhny Novgorod Oblast, a settlement in Voskhodovsky Selsoviet of Varnavinsky District

== Novgorod Oblast ==
As of 2010, one rural locality in Novgorod Oblast bears this name:

- Voskhod, Novgorod Oblast, a village in Slavitinskoye Settlement of Volotovsky District

== Novosibirsk Oblast ==
As of 2010, two rural localities in Novosibirsk Oblast bear this name:

- Voskhod, Kolyvansky District, Novosibirsk Oblast, a settlement in Kolyvansky District
- Voskhod, Novosibirsky District, Novosibirsk Oblast, a settlement in Novosibirsky District

== Oryol Oblast ==
As of 2010, two rural localities in Oryol Oblast bear this name:

- Voskhod, Khotynetsky District, Oryol Oblast, a settlement in Studenovsky Selsoviet of Khotynetsky District
- Voskhod, Uritsky District, Oryol Oblast, a settlement in Kotovsky Selsoviet of Uritsky District

== Perm Krai ==
As of 2010, one rural locality in Perm Krai bears this name:

- Voskhod, Perm Krai, a village under the administrative jurisdiction of the city of krai significance of Chusovoy

== Rostov Oblast ==
As of 2010, one rural locality in Rostov Oblast bears this name:

- Voskhod, Rostov Oblast, a settlement in Yuzhnenskoye Rural Settlement of Martynovsky District

== Ryazan Oblast ==
As of 2010, two rural localities in Ryazan Oblast bear this name:

- Voskhod, Kadomsky District, Ryazan Oblast, a selo in Voskhodsky Rural Okrug of Kadomsky District
- Voskhod, Sasovsky District, Ryazan Oblast, a village in Verkhne-Nikolsky Rural Okrug of Sasovsky District

== Sakhalin Oblast ==
As of 2010, one rural locality in Sakhalin Oblast bears this name:

- Voskhod, Sakhalin Oblast, a selo in Tymovsky District

== Saratov Oblast ==
As of 2010, one rural locality in Saratov Oblast bears this name:

- Voskhod, Saratov Oblast, a settlement in Balashovsky District

== Sverdlovsk Oblast ==
As of 2010, one rural locality in Sverdlovsk Oblast bears this name:

- Voskhod, Sverdlovsk Oblast, a settlement in Kamyshlovsky District

== Tambov Oblast ==
As of 2010, one rural locality in Tambov Oblast bears this name:

- Voskhod, Tambov Oblast, a settlement in Kobyakovsky Selsoviet of Kirsanovsky District

== Republic of Tatarstan ==
As of 2010, one rural locality in the Republic of Tatarstan bears this name:

- Voskhod, Republic of Tatarstan, a village in Leninogorsky District

== Tula Oblast ==
As of 2010, one rural locality in Tula Oblast bears this name:

- Voskhod, Tula Oblast, a village in Muravlyansky Rural Okrug of Kimovsky District

== Tver Oblast ==
As of 2010, two rural localities in Tver Oblast bear this name:

- Voskhod, Torzhoksky District, Tver Oblast, a village in Torzhoksky District
- Voskhod, Vesyegonsky District, Tver Oblast, a village in Vesyegonsky District

== Ulyanovsk Oblast ==
As of 2010, one rural locality in Ulyanovsk Oblast bears this name:

- Voskhod, Ulyanovsk Oblast, a settlement in Pribrezhnensky Rural Okrug of Staromaynsky District

== Vladimir Oblast ==
As of 2010, one rural locality in Vladimir Oblast bears this name:

- Voskhod, Vladimir Oblast, a settlement in Kovrovsky District
