= Yemashi =

Yemashi Емаши
- Selo
- Location within Bashkortostan Location within Russia
- Coordinates: 55°56′N 58°36′E
- Country: Russia
- Region: Bashkortostan
- District: Belokataysky District

Population (2010)
  - Total: 1,025
- Time zone: UTC+5:00

Yemashi (Russian: Емаши; Bashkir: Ямаш, Yamaş) is a rural locality (a selo) and the administrative centre of Yemashinsky Selsoviet, Belokataysky District, Bashkortostan, Russia. The population was 1,025 as of 2010. There are 13 streets.

== Geography ==
Yemashi is located 47 km northwest of Novobelokatay (the district's administrative centre) by road. Nogushi is the nearest rural locality.
