= Absalyamovo =

Absalyamovo (Russian: Абсалямово) is the name of several rural localities in Russia:

- Absalyamovo, Belokataysky District, Bashkortostan, a selo in Belokataysky District of Bashkortostan
- Absalyamovo, Uchalinsky District, Bashkortostan, a village in Uchalinsky District of Bashkortostan
- Absalyamovo (settlement), Yutazinsky District, Tatarstan, a settlement in Yutazinsky District of Tatarstan
- Absalyamovo (village), Yutazinsky District, Tatarstan, a village in Yutazinsky District of Tatarstan
