= Maskara =

Maskara may refer to:

== Geography ==
- Mascara, Algeria, also spelled Maskara
- Maskara, Tatarstan, Russia

== Music ==
=== Songs ===
- "Maskara", from the 2001 Eraserheads album Carbon Stereoxide
- "Maskara", from the 2008 Rivermaya album Buhay
- "Maskara", from the 2023 Dilaw EP Sansinukob
- "Maskara", the theme song of the 2024–2025 television series Lavender Fields

=== Other ===
- Maskara, a 1936 operetta by Cemal Reşit Rey
- Maskara, a 1974 album by Juan de la Cruz Band

== Television ==
- "Maskara", a 1991 episode of Maalaala Mo Kaya
- "Maskara", a 2016 episode of Ang Probinsyano
- "Maskara", a 2017 episode of Wildflower
- "Maskara", a 2018 episode of Asintado
- "Maskara", a 2019 episode of Los Bastardos
- "Maskara", a 2023 episode of The Iron Heart

== Other ==
- Maskara, a cut of pork comprising the jowls, snout, and ears

== See also ==
- Bacolod Maskaras, a Maharlika Pilipinas Basketball League team
- Mascara, a cosmetic used to enhance the eyelashes
- MassKara Festival, held annually in October in Bacolod, Philippines
- Novaya Maskara, Bashkortostan, Russia
- Staraya Maskara, Bashkortostan, Russia
- Mascara (disambiguation)
