= Shaydala =

Shaydala Шайдала
- Village
- Location within Bashkortostan Location within Russia
- Coordinates: 56°07′N 59°12′E
- Country: Russia
- Region: Bashkortostan
- District: Belokataysky District
- Time zone: UTC+5:00

Shaydala (Russian: Шайдала; Bashkir: Шайҙалы, Şayźalı) is a rural locality (a village) in Belyankovsky Selsoviet, Belokataysky District, Bashkortostan, Russia. The population was 48 as of 2010. There are 3 streets.

== Geography ==
Shaydala is located 57 km northeast of Novobelokatay and 15 km from Belyanka. Shaydala is also at the very edge of Belokataysky District. Shaydala is positioned between the Volga river and the Ural mountains, two of the major geographical features of Russia.
