= Morozovka, Republic of Bashkortostan =

Morozovka Морозовка
- Village
- Location within Bashkortostan Location within Russia
- Coordinates: 55°33′N 59°29′E
- Country: Russia
- Region: Bashkortostan
- District: Belokataysky District
- Time zone: UTC+5:00

Morozovka (Russian: Морозовка) is a rural locality (a village) in Urgalinsky Selsoviet, Belokataysky District, Bashkortostan, Russia. The population was 63 as of 2010. There are 2 streets.

== Geography ==
Morozovka is located 45 km southeast of Novobelokatay (the district's administrative centre) by road. Urgala is the nearest rural locality.
