= Sokolki, Belokataysky District, Republic of Bashkortostan =

Sokolki Соколки
- Selo
- Location within Bashkortostan Location within Russia
- Coordinates: 55°44′N 58°53′E
- Country: Russia
- Region: Bashkortostan
- District: Belokataysky District
- Time zone: UTC+5:00

Sokolki (Russian: Соколки; Bashkir: Соҡалы, Soqalı) is a rural locality (a selo) in Novobelokataysky Selsoviet, Belokataysky District, Bashkortostan, Russia. The population was 256 as of 2010. There are 8 streets.

== Geography ==
Sokolki is located 6 km northwest of Novobelokatay (the district's administrative centre) by road. Novobelokatay is the nearest rural locality.
