= Starobelokatay =

Starobelokatay Старобелокатай
- Selo
- Location within Bashkortostan Location within Russia
- Coordinates: 55°46′N 58°58′E
- Country: Russia
- Region: Bashkortostan
- District: Belokataysky District
- Time zone: UTC+5:00

Starobelokatay (Russian: Старобелокатай; Bashkir: Иҫке Балаҡатай, İśke Balaqatay) is a rural locality (a selo) and the administrative centre of Starobelokataysky Selsoviet, Belokataysky District, Bashkortostan, Russia. The population was 825 as of 2010. There are 12 streets.

== Geography ==
Starobelokatay is located 11 km north of Novobelokatay (the district's administrative centre) by road. Novobelokatay is the nearest rural locality.
