= Maygaza =

Maygaza Майгаза
- Selo
- Location within Bashkortostan Location within Russia
- Coordinates: 55°36′N 58°52′E
- Country: Russia
- Region: Bashkortostan
- District: Belokataysky District
- Time zone: UTC+5:00

Maygaza (Russian: Майгаза; Bashkir: Майғаҙы, Mayğaźı) is a rural locality (a selo) and the administrative centre of Maygazinsky Selsoviet, Belokataysky District, Bashkortostan, Russia. The population was 672 as of 2010. There are 15 streets.

== Geography ==
Maygaza is located 16 km southwest of Novobelokatay (the district's administrative centre) by road. Verkhneutyashevo is the nearest rural locality.
