= Voskhod, Zalesovsky District, Altai Krai =

Voskhod Восход
- Selo
- Location within Altai Krai Location within Russia
- Coordinates: 53°59′N 84°16′E
- Country: Russia
- Region: Altai Krai
- District: Zalesovsky District
- Time zone: UTC+7:00

Voskhod (Russian: Восход) is a rural locality (a selo) in Cheryomushkinskoye Selsoviet, Zalesovsky District, Altai Krai, Russia. The population was 17 as of 2013. There is 1 street.

== Geography ==
Voskhod is located 37 km west of Zalesovo (the district's administrative centre) by road. Cheryomushkino is the nearest rural locality.
