= Shigayevka =

Shigayevka Шигаевка
- Village
- Location within Bashkortostan Location within Russia
- Coordinates: 55°55′N 58°34′E
- Country: Russia
- Region: Bashkortostan
- District: Belokataysky District
- Time zone: UTC+5:00

Shigayevka (Russian: Шигаевка; Bashkir: Шығай, Şığay) is a rural locality (a village) in Yemashinsky Selsoviet, Belokataysky District, Bashkortostan, Russia. The population was 44 as of 2010. There are 3 streets.

== Geography ==
Shigayevka is located 43 km northwest of Novobelokatay (the district's administrative centre) by road. Yemashi is the nearest rural locality.
