= Khaybatovo =

Khaybatovo Хайбатово
- Village
- Location within Bashkortostan Location within Russia
- Coordinates: 55°34′N 59°33′E
- Country: Russia
- Region: Bashkortostan
- District: Belokataysky District
- Time zone: UTC+5:00

Khaybatovo (Russian: Хайбатово; Bashkir: Һәйбәт, Häybät) is a rural locality (a village) in Urgalinsky Selsoviet, Belokataysky District, Bashkortostan, Russia. The population was 143 as of 2010. There are 3 streets.

== Geography ==
Khaybatovo is located 51 km southeast of Novobelokatay (the district's administrative centre) by road. Morozovka is the nearest rural locality.
