= Dumchevo =

Dumchevo Думчево
- Selo
- Location within Altai Krai Location within Russia
- Coordinates: 53°57′N 84°17′E
- Country: Russia
- Region: Altai Krai
- District: Zalesovsky District
- Time zone: UTC+7:00

Dumchevo (Russian: Думчево) is a rural locality (a selo) and the administrative center of Dumchevsky Selsoviet, Zalesovsky District, Altai Krai, Russia. The population was 612 as of 2013. There are 9 streets.

== Geography ==
Dumchevo is located 33 km west of Zalesovo (the district's administrative centre) by road. Nogino is the nearest rural locality.
