= Zaplyvino =

Zaplyvino Заплывино
- Selo
- Location within Altai Krai Location within Russia
- Coordinates: 53°56′N 84°34′E
- Country: Russia
- Region: Altai Krai
- District: Zalesovsky District
- Time zone: UTC+7:00

Zaplyvino (Russian: Заплывино) is a rural locality (a selo) in Tundrikhinsky Selsoviet, Zalesovsky District, Altai Krai, Russia. The population was 214 as of 2013. There are 6 streets.

== Geography ==
Zaplyvino is located 15 km southwest of Zalesovo (the district's administrative centre) by road. Ust-Kamenka is the nearest rural locality.
