= Urakovo =

Urakovo Ураково
- Village
- Location within Bashkortostan Location within Russia
- Coordinates: 55°39′N 59°05′E
- Country: Russia
- Region: Bashkortostan
- District: Belokataysky District
- Time zone: UTC+5:00

Urakovo (Russian: Ураково; Bashkir: Ураҡ, Uraq) is a rural locality (a village) in Atarshinsky Selsoviet, Belokataysky District, Bashkortostan, Russia. The population was 173 as of 2010. There are 5 streets.

== Geography ==
Urakovo is located 13 km southeast of Novobelokatay (the district's administrative centre) by road. Atarsha is the nearest rural locality.
