= Medyatovo =

Medyatovo Медятово
- Village
- Location within Bashkortostan Location within Russia
- Coordinates: 55°45′N 58°39′E
- Country: Russia
- Region: Bashkortostan
- District: Belokataysky District
- Time zone: UTC+5:00

Medyatovo (Russian: Медятово; Bashkir: Миҙәт, Miźät) is a rural locality (a village) in Maygazinsky Selsoviet, Belokataysky District, Bashkortostan, Russia. The population was 192 as of 2010. There are 3 streets.

== Geography ==
Medyatovo is located 23 km northwest of Novobelokatay (the district's administrative centre) by road. Yanybayevo is the nearest rural locality.
