= Maly Kaltay =

Maly Kaltay Малый Калтай
- Selo
- Location within Altai Krai Location within Russia
- Coordinates: 53°59′N 84°10′E
- Country: Russia
- Region: Altai Krai
- District: Zalesovsky District
- Time zone: UTC+7:00

Maly Kaltay (Russian: Малый Калтай) is a rural locality (a selo) in Cheryomushkinskoye Selsoviet, Zalesovsky District, Altai Krai, Russia. The population was 121 as of 2013. There are 2 streets.

== Geography ==
Maly Kaltay is located 42 km west of Zalesovo (the district's administrative centre) by road. Cheryomushkino is the nearest rural locality.

== Population ==
As of 2015, the population of Maly Kaltay was estimated at 19 people, a 36.7% decrease from the year 2000. The village covers an area of 0.307 km², resulting in a population density of around 62 people per square kilometer.

== Time Zone ==
Maly Kaltay is located in the Omsk Time Zone (UTC+7:00)
