= Levali =

Levali Левали
- Village
- Location within Bashkortostan Location within Russia
- Coordinates: 55°43′N 58°37′E
- Country: Russia
- Region: Bashkortostan
- District: Belokataysky District
- Time zone: UTC+5:00

Levali (Russian: Левали; Bashkir: Ләүәле, Läwäle) is a rural locality (a village) and the administrative centre of Tardavsky Selsoviet, Belokataysky District, Bashkortostan, Russia. The population was 314 as of 2010. There are 5 streets.

== Geography ==
Levali is located 27 km west of Novobelokatay (the district's administrative centre) by road. Medyatovo is the nearest rural locality.
