= Belyanka (disambiguation) =

Belyanka may refer to:

- Belyanka, a rural locality in Bashkortostan, Russia
- Belyanka, Belgorod Oblast, a rural locality in Belgorod Oblast, Russia
- Belyanka (river), a tributary of the Lena, Russian Far East
