= Kurgashka =

Kurgashka Кургашка
- Village
- Location within Bashkortostan Location within Russia
- Coordinates: 55°55′N 58°50′E
- Country: Russia
- Region: Bashkortostan
- District: Belokataysky District
- Time zone: UTC+5:00

Kurgashka (Russian: Кургашка; Bashkir: Ҡурғаш, Qurğaş) is a rural locality (a village) in Karlykhanovsky Selsoviet, Belokataysky District, Bashkortostan, Russia. The population was 13 as of 2010. There is 1 street.

== Geography ==
Kurgashka is located 40 km north of Novobelokatay (the district's administrative centre) by road. Sandalashka is the nearest rural locality.
