= Vaselga =

Vaselga Васелга
- Village
- Location within Bashkortostan Location within Russia
- Coordinates: 55°38′N 58°43′E
- Country: Russia
- Region: Bashkortostan
- District: Belokataysky District
- Time zone: UTC+5:00

Vaselga (Russian: Васелга; Bashkir: Васйылға, Wasyılğa) is a rural locality (a village) in Maygazinsky Selsoviet, Belokataysky District, Bashkortostan, Russia. The population was 178 as of 2010. There are 3 streets.

== Geography ==
Vaselga is located 28 km southwest of Novobelokatay (the district's administrative centre) by road. Abzayevo is the nearest rural locality.
