= Verkhny Iskush =

Verkhny Iskush Верхний Искуш
- Selo
- Location within Bashkortostan Location within Russia
- Coordinates: 55°50′N 58°46′E
- Country: Russia
- Region: Bashkortostan
- District: Belokataysky District
- Time zone: UTC+5:00

Verkhny Iskush (Russian: Верхний Искуш; Bashkir: Үрге Исҡуш, Ürge İsquş) is a rural locality (a selo) in Nizhneiskushinsky Selsoviet, Belokataysky District, Bashkortostan, Russia. The population was 109 as of 2010. There is 1 street.

== Geography ==
Verkhny Iskush is located 31 km northwest of Novobelokatay (the district's administrative centre) by road. Nizhny Iskush is the nearest rural locality.
