= Karantrav =

Karantrav Карантрав
- Selo
- Location within Bashkortostan Location within Russia
- Coordinates: 55°36′N 59°10′E
- Country: Russia
- Region: Bashkortostan
- District: Belokataysky District
- Time zone: UTC+5:00

Karantrav (Russian: Карантрав; Bashkir: Ҡаранторау, Qarantoraw) is a rural locality (a selo) in Urgalinsky Selsoviet, Belokataysky District, Bashkortostan, Russia. The population was 264 as of 2010. There are 4 streets.

== Geography ==
Karantrav is located 23 km southeast of Novobelokatay (the district's administrative centre) by road. Urakovo is the nearest rural locality.
