= Zalesovo =

Zalesovo (Russian: Залесово) is the name of several rural localities in Russia:

- Zalesovo, Altai Krai, a selo in Zalesovsky Selsoviet of Zalesovsky District of Altai Krai
- Zalesovo, Orenburg Oblast, a selo in Zalesovsky Selsoviet of Krasnogvardeysky District of Orenburg Oblast
- Zalesovo, Shokinskoye Rural Settlement, Kardymovsky District, Smolensk Oblast, a village in Shokinskoye Rural Settlement of Kardymovsky District of Smolensk Oblast
- Zalesovo, Tyushinskoye Rural Settlement, Kardymovsky District, Smolensk Oblast, a village in Tyushinskoye Rural Settlement of Kardymovsky District of Smolensk Oblast
- Zalesovo, Tula Oblast, a village in Kozlovsky Rural Okrug of Venyovsky District of Tula Oblast
