= Yuldashevo, Belokataysky District, Republic of Bashkortostan =

Yuldashevo Юлдашево
- Village
- Location within Bashkortostan Location within Russia
- Coordinates: 55°39′N 59°16′E
- Country: Russia
- Region: Bashkortostan
- District: Belokataysky District
- Time zone: UTC+5:00

Yuldashevo (Russian: Юлдашево; Bashkir: Юлдаш, Yuldaş) is a rural locality (a village) in Urgalinsky Selsoviet, Belokataysky District, Bashkortostan, Russia. The population was 102 as of 2010. There are 2 streets.

== Geography ==
Yuldashevo is located 30 km southeast of Novobelokatay (the district's administrative centre) by road. Karantrav is the nearest rural locality.
