= Urgala =

Urgala Ургала
- Selo
- Location within Bashkortostan Location within Russia
- Coordinates: 56°02′N 59°14′E
- Country: Russia
- Region: Bashkortostan
- District: Belokataysky District
- Time zone: UTC+5:00

Urgala (Russian: Ургала; Bashkir: Урғалы, Urğalı) is a rural locality (a selo) and the administrative centre of Urgalinsky Selsoviet, Belokataysky District, Bashkortostan, Russia. The population was 1,672 as of 2010. There are 21 streets.

== Geography ==
Urgala is located 44 km southeast of Novobelokatay (the district's administrative centre) by road. Morozovka is the nearest rural locality.
