= Nizhneutyashevo =

Nizhneutyashevo Нижнеутяшево
- Selo
- Location within Bashkortostan Location within Russia
- Coordinates: 55°39′N 58°58′E
- Country: Russia
- Region: Bashkortostan
- District: Belokataysky District
- Time zone: UTC+5:00

Nizhneutyashevo (Russian: Нижнеутяшево; Bashkir: Түбәнге Үтәш, Tübänge Ütäş) is a rural locality (a selo) and the administrative centre of Utyashevsky Selsoviet, Belokataysky District, Bashkortostan, Russia. The population was 420 as of 2010. There are 6 streets.

== Geography ==
Nizhneutyashevo is located 6 km south of Novobelokatay (the district's administrative centre) by road. Verkhneutyashevo is the nearest rural locality.
