= Aydakayevo =

Aydakayevo Айдакаево
- Village
- Location within Bashkortostan Location within Russia
- Coordinates: 55°54′N 58°43′E
- Country: Russia
- Region: Bashkortostan
- District: Belokataysky District
- Time zone: UTC+5:00

Aydakayevo (Russian: Айдакаево; Bashkir: Айҙаҡай, Ayźaqay) is a rural locality (a village) in Karlykhanovsky Selsoviet, Belokataysky District, Bashkortostan, Russia. The population was 336 as of 2010. There are 8 streets.

== Geography ==
Aydakayevo is located 38 km northwest of Novobelokatay (the district's administrative centre) by road. Karlykhanovo is the nearest rural locality.
