= Atarsha =

Atarsha Апутово
- Selo
- Location within Bashkortostan Location within Russia
- Coordinates: 55°37′N 59°00′E
- Country: Russia
- Region: Bashkortostan
- District: Belokataysky District
- Time zone: UTC+5:00

Atarsha (Russian: Атарша; Bashkir: Атарша, Atarşa) is a rural locality (a selo) and the administrative centre of Atarshinsky Selsoviet, Belokataysky District, Bashkortostan, Russia. The population was 375 as of 2010. There are 5 streets.

== Geography ==
Atarsha is located 13 km south of Novobelokatay (the district's administrative centre) by road. Verkhneutyashevo is the nearest rural locality.
