= Ashayevo =

Ashayevo Ашаево
- Village
- Location within Bashkortostan Location within Russia
- Coordinates: 55°55′N 59°11′E
- Country: Russia
- Region: Bashkortostan
- District: Belokataysky District
- Time zone: UTC+5:00

Ashayevo (Russian: Ашаево; Bashkir: Әшәй, Äşäy) is a rural locality (a village) in Belyankovsky Selsoviet, Belokataysky District, Bashkortostan, Russia. The population was 233 as of 2010. There are 5 streets.

== Geography ==
Ashayevo is located 33 km northeast of Novobelokatay (the district's administrative centre) by road. Novaya Maskara is the nearest rural locality.
