= Munasovo =

Munasovo Мунасово
- Village
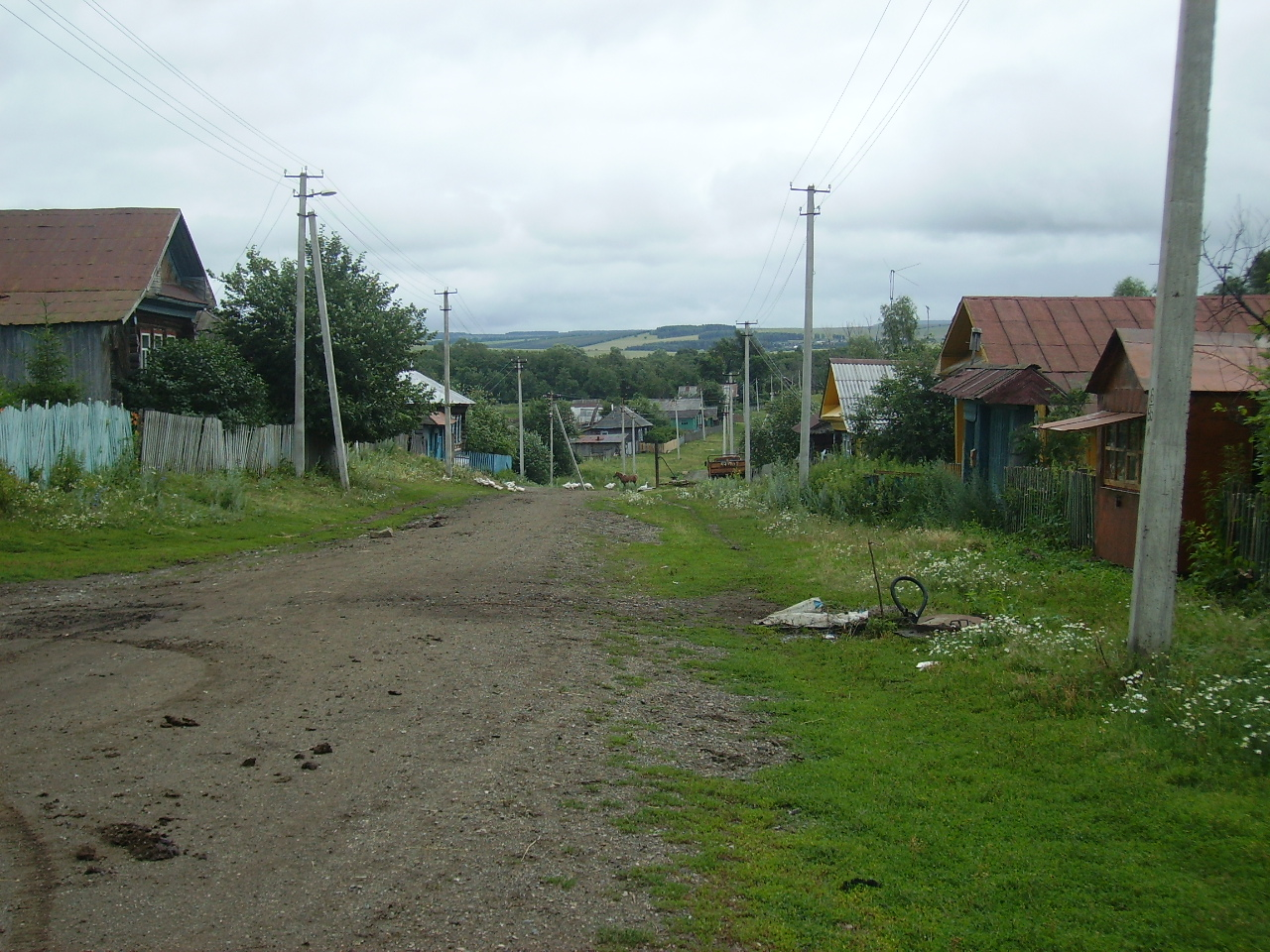

- Location within Bashkortostan Location within Russia
- Coordinates: 55°45′N 58°35′E
- Country: Russia
- Region: Bashkortostan
- District: Belokataysky District

Population (2010)
  - Total: 123
- Time zone: UTC+5:00

Munasovo (Russian: Мунасово; Bashkir: Монас, Monas) is a rural locality (a village) in Yanybayevsky Selsoviet, Belokataysky District, Bashkortostan, Russia. The population was 123 as of 2010. There is 1 street.

== Geography ==
Munasovo is located 27 km northwest of Novobelokatay (the district's administrative centre) by road. Voskhod is the nearest rural locality.
