= Karlykhanovo =

Karlykhanovo Карлыханово
- Selo
- Location within Bashkortostan Location within Russia
- Coordinates: 55°57′N 58°41′E
- Country: Russia
- Region: Bashkortostan
- District: Belokataysky District

Population (2010)
  - Total: 1,343
- Time zone: UTC+5:00

Karlykhanovo (Russian: Карлыханово; Bashkir: Ҡарлыхан, Qarlıxan) is a rural locality (a selo) and the administrative centre of Karlykhanovsky Selsoviet, Belokataysky District, Bashkortostan, Russia. The population was 1,343 as of 2010. There are 22 streets.

== Geography ==
Karlykhanovo is located 40 km northwest of Novobelokatay (the district's administrative centre) by road. Nogushi is the nearest rural locality.
