= Sosnovy Log =

Sosnovy Log Сосновый Лог
- Village
- Location within Bashkortostan Location within Russia
- Coordinates: 55°48′N 58°37′E
- Country: Russia
- Region: Bashkortostan
- District: Belokataysky District
- Time zone: UTC+5:00

Sosnovy Log (Russian: Сосновый Лог) is a rural locality (a village) in Nizhneiskushinsky Selsoviet, Belokataysky District, Bashkortostan, Russia. The population was 125 as of 2010. There are 4 streets.

== Geography ==
Sosnovy Log is located 29 km northwest of Novobelokatay (the district's administrative centre) by road. Nizhny Iskush is the nearest rural locality.
