= Aygyryal =

Aygyryal Айгырьял
- Village
- Location within Bashkortostan Location within Russia
- Coordinates: 55°43′N 58°48′E
- Country: Russia
- Region: Bashkortostan
- District: Belokataysky District
- Time zone: UTC+5:00

Aygyryal (Russian: Айгырьял; Bashkir: Айғыръял, Ayğıryal) is a rural locality (a village) in Yanybayevsky Selsoviet, Belokataysky District, Bashkortostan, Russia. The population was 188 as of 2010. There are 2 streets.

== Geography ==
Aygyryal is located 12 km west of Novobelokatay (the district's administrative centre) by road. Sokolki is the nearest rural locality.
