= Verkhneutyashevo =

Verkhneutyashevo Верхнеутяшево
- Village
- Location within Bashkortostan Location within Russia
- Coordinates: 55°38′N 58°58′E
- Country: Russia
- Region: Bashkortostan
- District: Belokataysky District
- Time zone: UTC+5:00

Verkhneutyashevo (Russian: Верхнеутяшево; Bashkir: Үрге Үтәш, Ürge Ütäş) is a rural locality (a village) in Utyashevsky Selsoviet, Belokataysky District, Bashkortostan, Russia. The population was 248 as of 2010. There are 3 streets.

== Geography ==
Verkhneutyashevo is located 10 km south of Novobelokatay (the district's administrative centre) by road. Atarsha is the nearest rural locality.
