= Tardavka =

Tardavka Тардавка
- Selo
- Location within Bashkortostan Location within Russia
- Coordinates: 55°39′N 58°38′E
- Country: Russia
- Region: Bashkortostan
- District: Belokataysky District
- Time zone: UTC+5:00

Tardavka (Russian: Тардавка; Bashkir: Тарҙау, Tarźaw) is a rural locality (a selo) in Tardavsky Selsoviet, Belokataysky District, Bashkortostan, Russia. The population was 89 as of 2010. There are 2 streets.

== Geography ==
Tardavka is located 34 km southwest of Novobelokatay (the district's administrative centre) by road. Levali is the nearest rural locality.
