= Peshcherka =

Peshcherka Пещерка
- Selo
- Location within Altai Krai Location within Russia
- Coordinates: 54°05′N 84°46′E
- Country: Russia
- Region: Altai Krai
- District: Zalesovsky District
- Time zone: UTC+7:00

Peshcherka (Russian: Пещерка) is a rural locality (selo), and the administrative center of Peshchersky Selsoviet, Zalesovsky District, Altai Krai, Russia. The population was 1,198 as of 2013. There are 13 streets.

== Geography ==
Peshcherka is located 20 km north of Zalesovo (the district's administrative centre) by road. Zalesovo is the nearest rural locality.
