= Kirikeyevo =

Kirikeyevo Кирикеево
- Village
- Location within Bashkortostan Location within Russia
- Coordinates: 56°04′N 59°13′E
- Country: Russia
- Region: Bashkortostan
- District: Belokataysky District
- Time zone: UTC+5:00

Kirikeyevo (Russian: Кирикеево; Bashkir: Ҡараҡай, Qaraqay) is a rural locality (a village) in Belyankovsky Selsoviet, Belokataysky District, Bashkortostan, Russia. The population was 310 as of 2010. There are 3 streets.

== Geography ==
Kirikeyevo is located 50 km north of Novobelokatay (the district's administrative centre) by road. Kayupovo is the nearest rural locality.
