= Krasny Muravey =

Krasny Muravey Красный Муравей
- Village
- Location within Bashkortostan Location within Russia
- Coordinates: 55°36′N 59°04′E
- Country: Russia
- Region: Bashkortostan
- District: Belokataysky District
- Time zone: UTC+5:00

Krasny Muravey (Russian: Красный Муравей) is a rural locality (a village) in Atarshinsky Selsoviet, Belokataysky District, Bashkortostan, Russia. The population was 41 as of 2010. There are 2 streets.

== Geography ==
Krasny Muravey is located 18 km southeast of Novobelokatay (the district's administrative centre) by road. Atarsha is the nearest rural locality.
