= Kayupovo =

Kayupovo Каюпово
- Village
- Location within Bashkortostan Location within Russia
- Coordinates: 56°03′N 59°14′E
- Country: Russia
- Region: Bashkortostan
- District: Belokataysky District
- Time zone: UTC+5:00

Kayupovo (Russian: Каюпово; Bashkir: Ҡәйүп, Qäyüp) is a rural locality (a village) in Belyankovsky Selsoviet, Belokataysky District, Bashkortostan, Russia. The population was 122 as of 2010. There is 1 street.

== Geography ==
Kayupovo is located 50 km north of Novobelokatay (the district's administrative centre) by road. Kirikeyevo is the nearest rural locality.
