= Aputovo =

Aputovo Апутово
- Selo
- Location within Bashkortostan Location within Russia
- Coordinates: 55°41′N 59°01′E
- Country: Russia
- Region: Bashkortostan
- District: Belokataysky District
- Time zone: UTC+5:00

Aputovo (Russian: Апутово; Bashkir: Апут, Aput) is a rural locality (a selo) in Utyashevsky Selsoviet, Belokataysky District, Bashkortostan, Russia. The population was 274 as of 2010. There are 4 streets.

== Geography ==
Aputovo is located 5 km southeast of Novobelokatay (the district's administrative centre) by road. Novobelokatay is the nearest rural locality.
