= Shakarla =

Shakarla Шакарла
- Selo
- Location within Bashkortostan Location within Russia
- Coordinates: 55°45′N 59°08′E
- Country: Russia
- Region: Bashkortostan
- District: Belokataysky District
- Time zone: UTC+5:00

Shakarla (Russian: Шакарла; Bashkir: Шаҡарлы, Şaqarlı) is a rural locality (a selo) in Starobelokataysky Selsoviet, Belokataysky District, Bashkortostan, Russia. The population was 331 as of 2010. There are 5 streets.

== Geography ==
Shakarla is located 16 km northeast of Novobelokatay (the district's administrative centre) by road. Sokolki is the nearest rural locality.
