= Nizhny Iskush =

Nizhny Iskush Нижний Искуш
- Selo
- Location within Bashkortostan Location within Russia
- Coordinates: 55°49′N 58°43′E
- Country: Russia
- Region: Bashkortostan
- District: Belokataysky District
- Time zone: UTC+5:00

Nizhny Iskush (Russian: Нижний Искуш; Bashkir: Түбәнге Исҡуш, Tübänge İsquş) is a rural locality (a selo) and the administrative centre of Nizhneiskushinsky Selsoviet, Belokataysky District, Bashkortostan, Russia. The population was 394 as of 2010. There are 5 streets.

== Geography ==
Nizhny Iskush is located 27 km northwest of Novobelokatay (the district's administrative centre) by road. Verkhny Iskush is the nearest rural locality.
