= Krasny Pakhar, Republic of Bashkortostan =

Krasny Pakhar Красный Пахарь
- Village
- Location within Bashkortostan Location within Russia
- Coordinates: 55°41′N 59°05′E
- Country: Russia
- Region: Bashkortostan
- District: Belokataysky District
- Time zone: UTC+5:00

Krasny Pakhar (Russian: Красный Пахарь) is a rural locality (a village) in Utyashevsky Selsoviet, Belokataysky District, Bashkortostan, Russia. The population was 130 as of 2010. There is 1 street.

== Geography ==
Krasny Pakhar is located 10 km southeast of Novobelokatay (the district's administrative centre) by road. Urakovo is the nearest rural locality.
