= Shatunovo =

Shatunovo Шатуново
- Selo
- Location within Altai Krai Location within Russia
- Coordinates: 53°53′N 84°31′E
- Country: Russia
- Region: Altai Krai
- District: Zalesovsky District
- Time zone: UTC+7:00

Shatunovo (Russian: Шатуново) is a rural locality (a selo) and the administrative center of Shatunovsky Selsoviet, Zalesovsky District, Altai Krai, Russia. The population was 836 as of 2013. There are 16 streets.

== Geography ==
Shatunovo is located 23 km southwest of Zalesovo (the district's administrative centre) by road. Kalinovka is the nearest rural locality.
