= Kadyrovo =

Kadyrovo Кадырово
- Village
- Location within Bashkortostan Location within Russia
- Coordinates: 55°31′N 59°09′E
- Country: Russia
- Region: Bashkortostan
- District: Belokataysky District
- Time zone: UTC+5:00

Kadyrovo (Russian: Кадырово; Bashkir: Ҡәҙер, Qäźer) is a rural locality (a village) in Atarshinsky Selsoviet, Belokataysky District, Bashkortostan, Russia. The population was 128 as of 2010. There are 5 streets.

== Geography ==
Kadyrovo is located 32 km southeast of Novobelokatay (the district's administrative centre) by road. Karantrav is the nearest rural locality.
