= Voskhod, Belokataysky District, Republic of Bashkortostan =

Voskhod Восход
- Village
- Location within Bashkortostan Location within Russia
- Coordinates: 55°44′N 58°32′E
- Country: Russia
- Region: Bashkortostan
- District: Belokataysky District

Population (2010)
  - Total: 66
- Time zone: UTC+5:00

Voskhod (Russian: Восход) is a rural locality (a village) in Tardavsky Selsoviet, Belokataysky District, Bashkortostan, Russia. The population was 66 as of 2010. There is 1 street.

== Geography ==
Voskhod is located 32 km west of Novobelokatay (the district's administrative centre) by road. Munasovo is the nearest rural locality.
