= Cheryomushkino =

Cheryomushkino Черёмушкино
- Selo
- Location within Altai Krai Location within Russia
- Coordinates: 54°00′N 84°17′E
- Country: Russia
- Region: Altai Krai
- District: Zalesovsky District
- Time zone: UTC+7:00

Cheryomushkino (Russian: Черёмушкино) is a rural locality (a selo) and the administrative center of Cheryomushkinskoye Selsoviet, Zalesovsky District, Altai Krai, Russia. The population was 1,060 as of 2013. There are 9 streets.

== Geography ==
Cheryomushkino is located 34 km west of Zalesovo (the district's administrative centre) by road. Maly Kaltay is the nearest rural locality.
