= Absalyamovo, Belokataysky District, Bashkortostan =

Absalyamovo Абсалямово Әбсәләм
- Village
- Location within Bashkortostan Location within Russia
- Coordinates: 55°31′N 59°30′E
- Country: Russia
- Region: Bashkortostan
- District: Belokataysky District
- Time zone: UTC+5:00

Absalyamovo (Russian: Абсалямово, Bashkir: Әбсәләм, Äbsäläm) is a rural locality (a village) in Urgalinsky Selsoviet of Belokataysky District, Bashkortostan, Russia. The population was 244 as of 2010. There are 2 streets.

== Geography ==
Absalyamovo is located 49 km southeast of Novobelokatay (the district's administrative centre) by road. Urgala is the nearest rural locality.
