= Staraya Maskara =

Staraya Maskara Старая Маскара
- Village
- Location within Bashkortostan Location within Russia
- Coordinates: 55°59′N 59°12′E
- Country: Russia
- Region: Bashkortostan
- District: Belokataysky District
- Time zone: UTC+5:00

Staraya Maskara (Russian: Старая Маскара; Bashkir: Иҫке Масҡары, İśke Masqarı) is a rural locality (a village) in Belyankovsky Selsoviet, Belokataysky District, Bashkortostan, Russia. The population was 120 as of 2010. There are 4 streets.

== Geography ==
Staraya Maskara is located 41 km northeast of Novobelokatay (the district's administrative centre) by road. Pervomaysky is the nearest rural locality.
