= Nogushi =

Nogushi Ногуши
- Selo
- Location within Bashkortostan Location within Russia
- Coordinates: 55°57′N 58°39′E
- Country: Russia
- Region: Bashkortostan
- District: Belokataysky District

Population (2010)
  - Total: 628
- Time zone: UTC+5:00

Nogushi (Russian: Ногуши; Bashkir: Нөгөш, Nögöş) is a rural locality (a selo) and the administrative centre of Nogushinsky Selsoviet, Belokataysky District, Bashkortostan, Russia. The population was 628 as of 2010. There are 12 streets.

== Geography ==
Nogushi is located 44 km northwest of Novobelokatay (the district's administrative centre) by road. Karlykhanovo is the nearest rural locality.
