= Voskhod =

Voskhod (Russian: Восход: sunrise) may refer to:

- Voskhod programme, the Soviet programme of human spaceflight
- Voskhod (spacecraft), a spacecraft used in the Voskhod programme
- Voskhod (rocket), a rocket that was used to launch Voskhod spacecraft
- Voskhod, Russia, several rural localities in Russia
- Voskhod, Yalta Municipality, an urban-type settlement in Crimea, disputed between Ukraine and Russia
- Voskhod motorcycle, a brand of motorcycle
- Voskhod (hydrofoil), a class of hydrofoil boat built in Ukraine
- Voskhod (magazine), a periodical published in 1881–1906 in the Russian Empire

== See also ==
- Sunrise
