= Novaya Maskara =

Novaya Maskara Новая Маскара
- Village
- Location within Bashkortostan Location within Russia
- Coordinates: 55°53′N 59°11′E
- Country: Russia
- Region: Bashkortostan
- District: Belokataysky District
- Time zone: UTC+5:00

Novaya Maskara (Russian: Новая Маскара; Bashkir: Яңы Масҡары, Yañı Masqarı) is a rural locality (a village) in Belyankovsky Selsoviet, Belokataysky District, Bashkortostan, Russia. The population was 119 as of 2010. There are 2 streets.

== Geography ==
Novaya Maskara is located 30 km northeast of Novobelokatay (the district's administrative centre) by road. Ashayevo is the nearest rural locality.
