= Zalesovsky =

Zalesovsky (masculine), Zalesovskaya (feminine), or Zalesovskoye (neuter) may refer to:

- Zalesovsky District, a district of Altai Krai, Russia
- Zalesovsky (rural locality), a rural locality (a settlement) in Kurgan Oblast, Russia
