= Belyanka =

Belyanka Белянка
- Selo
- Location within Bashkortostan Location within Russia
- Coordinates: 56°02′N 59°14′E
- Country: Russia
- Region: Bashkortostan
- District: Belokataysky District
- Time zone: UTC+5:00

Belyanka (Russian: Белянка; Bashkir: Билән, Bilän) is a rural locality (a selo) and the administrative centre of Belyankovsky Selsoviet, Belokataysky District, Bashkortostan, Russia. The population was 853 as of 2010. There are 10 streets.

== Geography ==
Belyanka is located 48 km northeast of Novobelokatay (the district's administrative centre) by road. Kayupovo is the nearest rural locality.
