= Wildflower (TV series) =

2017–18 Philippine television drama series

- Season 4 title card
- Genre: Political drama; Romance; Action; Crime; Revenge; Suspense; Political thriller; Soap opera
- Created by: Willy Laconia; Carmela L. Abaygar
- Developed by: ABS-CBN Studios
- Directed by: Onat A. Diaz; Raymund B. Ocampo; Cathy O. Camarillo; Digo Ricio; Jerome C. Pobocan; Roderick P. Lindayag
- Creative director: Willy Laconsay
- Starring: Maja Salvador
- Music by: Carmina Cuya
- Opening theme: "Wildflower" by Arnel Pineda
- Composers: Doug Edwards; Dave Richardson
- Country of origin: Philippines
- Original language: Tagalog
- No. of seasons: 4
- No. of episodes: 257 (list of episodes)

Production
- Executive producers: Carlo Katigbak; Cory Vidanes; Laurenti Dyogi; Ruel Bayani
- Producers: Jason Aracap Tabigue; Edgar Joseph Mallari; Louver Asuncion-Galaritta; Maru R. Benitez; Rizza Gonzales-Ebriega
- Production locations: Tanay, Rizal, Philippines; Manila, Philippines; Magdalena, Laguna, Philippines
- Editors: Alexces Megan Abarquez; Jake Maderazo; Shyra Joaquin; Ronald Aguila; Christian Domingo; Kristine Hortaleza
- Running time: 25–35 minutes
- Production company: RSB Drama Unit

Original release
- Network: ABS-CBN
- Release: February 13, 2017 – February 9, 2018

Wildflower is a Philippine television drama revenge series broadcast by ABS-CBN. Directed by Onat A. Diaz, Raymund B. Ocampo, Cathy O. Camarillo, Digo Ricio, Jerome C. Pobocan and Roderick P. Lindayag, it stars Maja Salvador. It aired on the network's Primetime Bida line up and worldwide of TFC from February 13, 2017 to February 9, 2018, replacing We Will Survive and was replaced by The Blood Sisters.

== Series overview ==
The story revolves around Lily Cruz who (along with her family) falls victim to the ruthless Ardiente family. Emilia Torillo, the matriarch of the Ardiente family, orders an assassin on Lily's parents. Unbeknownst to Emilia, Lily survives the massacre and is adopted by Prianka Aguas, a billionaire businesswoman. Lily changes her identity to become Ivy Aguas, a strong-willed woman. She returns to Poblacion Ardiente as Ivy to avenge her parents and everyone else who were victimized by the evil Ardiente family.

Season	Episodes	Originally released	
Season	Episodes	First released	Last released
1	73	February 13, 2017	May 26, 2017
2	54	May 29, 2017	August 11, 2017
3	80	August 14, 2017	December 1, 2017
4	50	December 4, 2017	February 9, 2018

=== Season 1 (2017) ===
The story follows Lily Cruz, a beautiful heiress who wants justice for her father Dante's death and her mother Camia's assault and resulting insanity, by seeking revenge against the evil Ardiente family, a powerful political dynasty in the fictional province that bears their name. The Ardiente family is the most powerful political force in the province under the jurisdiction of the governor, Julio Ardiente, and his daughter, Emilia, the mayor of the municipality (Poblacion Ardiente). Emilia's philandering husband Raul assaults Camia prompting Dante to file rape charges against him. Lily's world crumbles when Dante suspiciously dies from a heart attack and she witnesses her mother's rape. Though she was targeted to be killed herself, the assassins feel pity for the 9-year old and frees her instead.

Prianka Aguas legally adopts Lily and raises her to become tough, providing her with the resources to seek justice for her parents. With a billion dollar conglomerate behind her, Ivy is a magnet for the Ardientes who are preparing their campaign for the gubernatorial and congressional elections.

=== Season 2 (2017) ===
Ivy seduces the Ardientes' weakest link, Arnaldo. He becomes obsessed with her and drives him near crazy. After several retaliatory attempts by Emilia against Ivy fails, Emilia is committed to a psychiatric facility. Ivy then instigates the removal of Julio Ardiente from office, weakens his hold on the province and then robs him of the only person he loves, his grandson, Arnaldo. However, throughout the sequence of events, the Ardientes have determined that Ivy is an adversary. Thus, they have her disposed of, by being buried alive in a wooden-coffin. She miraculously escapes death and returns with a vengeance.

=== Season 3 (2017) ===
In a carefully orchestrated hijacking, Ivy gatecrashes a celebration being held by the Ardientes and reveals her real identity as Lily Cruz, to the shock of the Ardientes who supervised her "burial" in the cemetery. Through a series of activities, she cripples Ardientes' powerful influence but a new hidden enemy suddenly surfaces. It is later on revealed that this is Helena Montoya, the real mother of Emilia Ardiente. Also, known in the criminal world as "Red Dragon", she controls the country's largest crime syndicate. Notwithstanding the sinister résumé, Helena is no match to Lily's superior skills, and after several conflicts, Lily brings Red Dragon's operations to a halt.

=== Season 4 (2017–18) ===
Diego and Lily get married and go off on their honeymoon. Arnaldo interrupts their celebration and commits suicide in front of them after being angrily rejected by Lily. In the mental asylum, Emilia is haunted by the evil ghosts of Helena and Arnaldo who exhort her to kill Diego and Lily to avenge their deaths. She unexpectedly regains her sanity, is released and obtains the support of the Asian syndicate using the password her mother gives her before she dies. Lily undermines Emilia's ascent into power when she notifies the syndicate leader that Julio Ardiente had ordered the "Red Dragon"'s murder. Meanwhile, Lily discovers valuable information about a mass grave the Ardientes begin to use in the mid-50s when the family first seized power. Lily orchestrates a leak, instructing Jepoy and Ana to contact local media about the mass grave and stir up the citizens of Poblacion Ardiente to do the same. The media frenzy covering the atrocities committed by the Ardientes embolden whistleblowers and other victims to speak up, including former accomplices and political supporters like Natalie, ex-bodyguards, former assassins, and Judge Lustre.

A popular uprising topples the Ardiente family. With solid evidence and witnesses no longer afraid to speak out, the people of Ardiente file cases of multiple murders, frustrated homicides, Estafa, plunder charges that would send them to prison for a long time, but Julio and Emilia escape capture. Their joy does not last long when Julio assassinates Diego with a sniper rifle, escaping once again to a Triad safe house.

Emilia realizes her father's direct hand in the murders of her Aunt Claire and mother Helena; and that he never respected her as an equal. As Lily tries to stop Julio from escaping, Emilia comes face-to-face with her father, who shoots him several times and in turn, shoots Emilia in the spine. Later, Emilia, now a paraplegic is serving her time in prison. Lily visits extending an Olive branch and forgives her. The story ends with an epilogue showing Venus (Helena Montoya's adopted daughter) torturing Julio to death with a blowtorch and subjecting him to human experimentation and Lily's successful senatorial and presidential ambition, commemorating the struggles she faced that makes her stronger through the years.

== Cast and characters ==
 NOTES:
- "Replacement character" Marked with(‡)
Cast

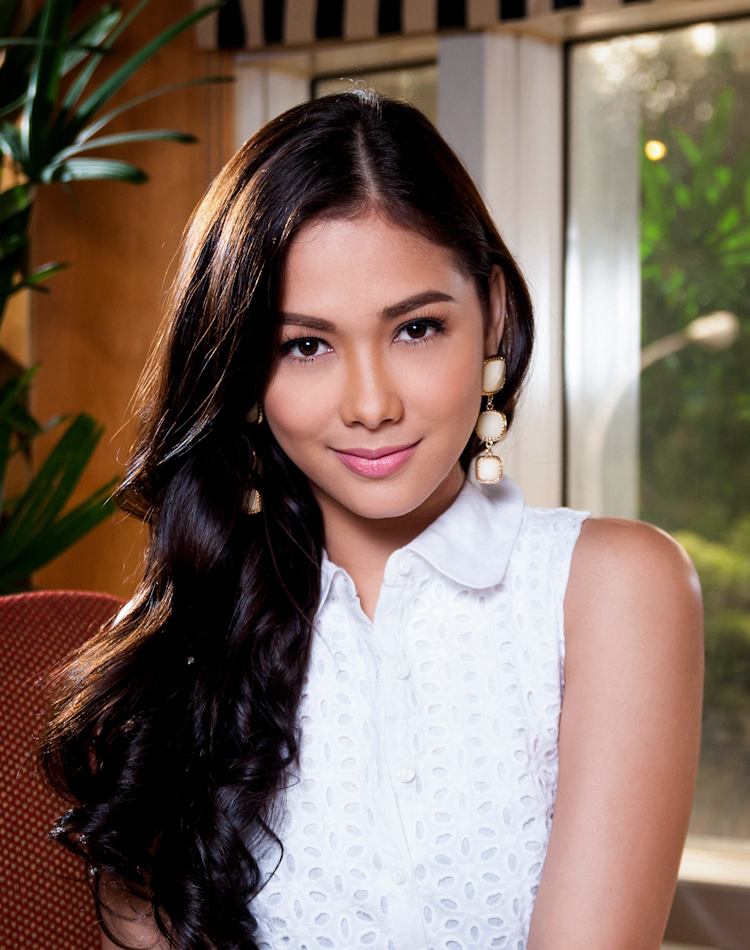
Maja Salvador

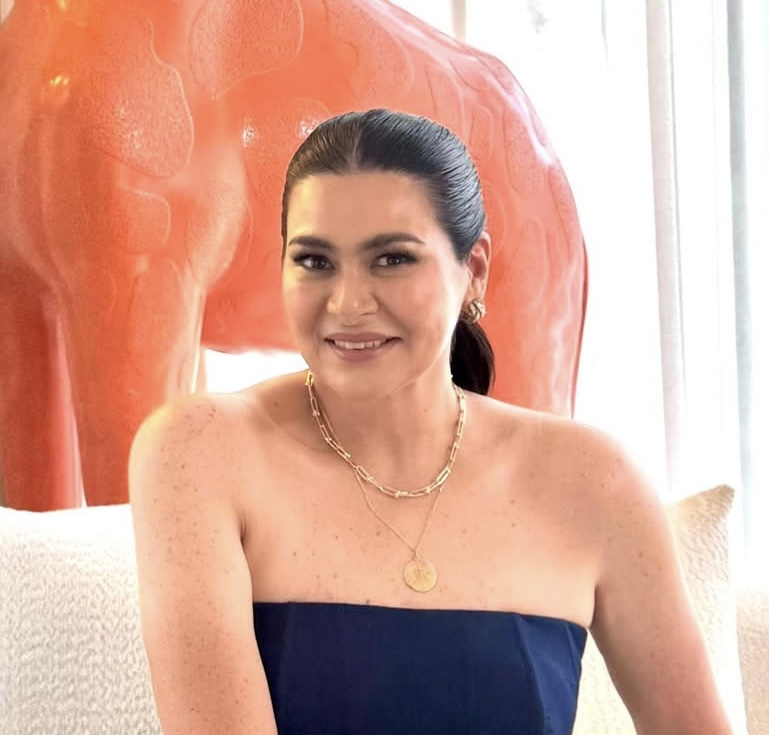
Aiko Melendez

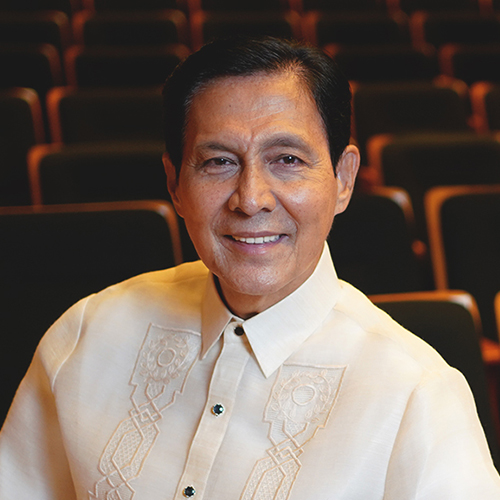
Tirso Cruz III

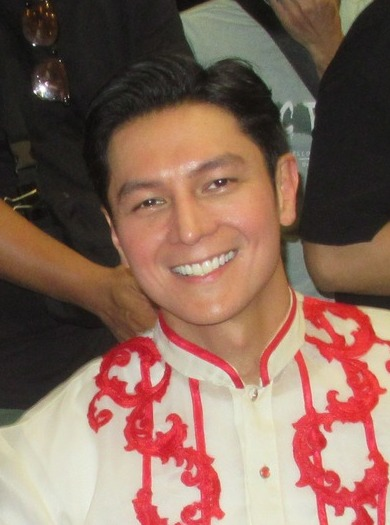
Joseph Marco

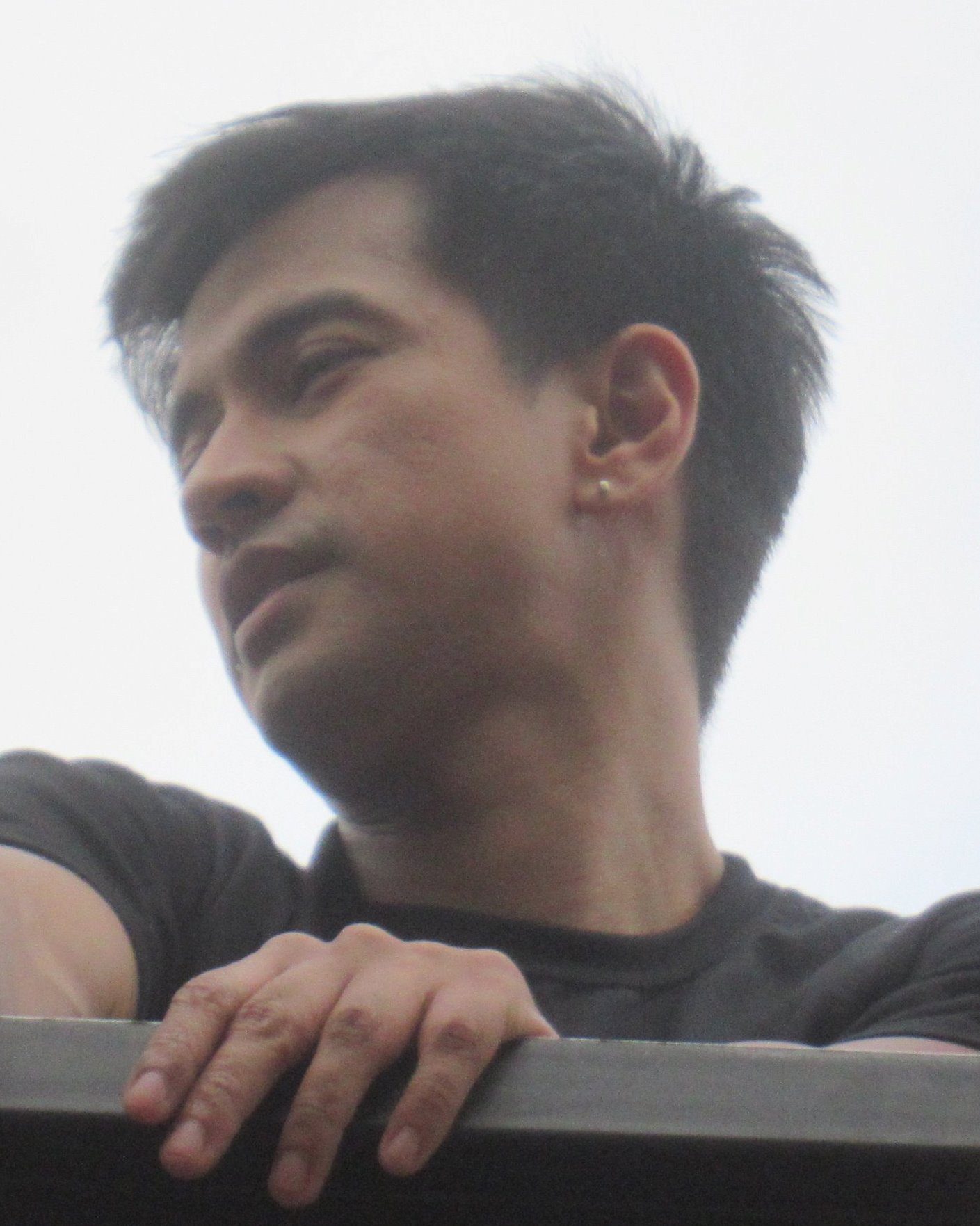
RK Bagatsing

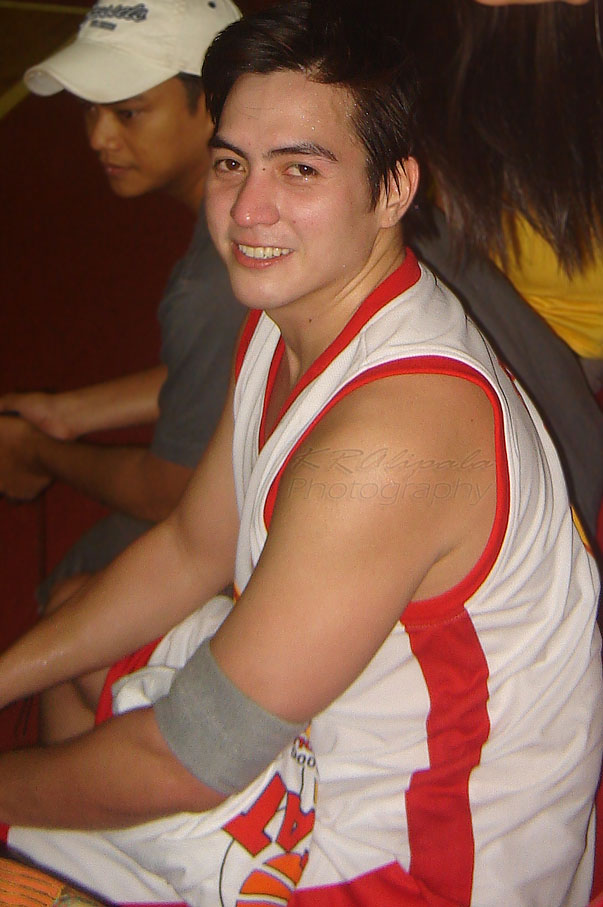
Wendell Ramos

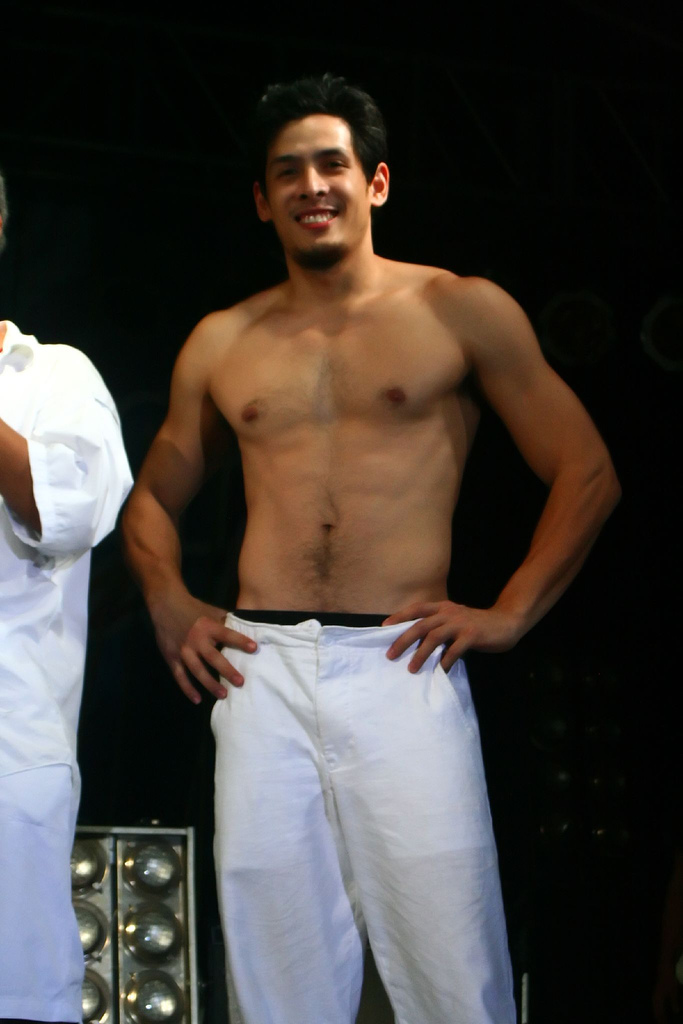
Christian Vasquez

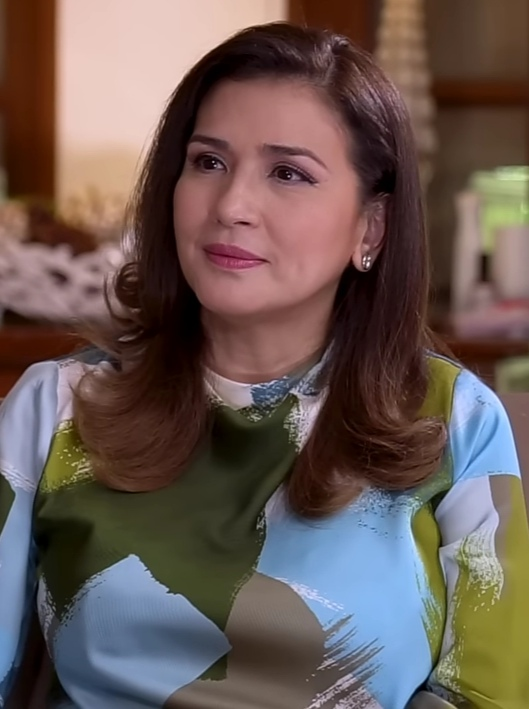
Zsa Zsa Padilla

- Maja Salvador as Ivy Aguas/ Lily D. Cruz
  - Xyriel Manabat as young Ivy Aguas/Lily Cruz
- Aiko Melendez as Emilia Ardiente-Torillo
  - Kyline Alcantara as teen Emilia
    - Jennica Garcia as young adult Emilia
- Tirso Cruz III as Julio Ardiente
  - Ejay Falcon as teen Julio
    - Patrick Garcia as young adult Julio
- Joseph Marco as Diego Torillo
  - Jesse James Ongteco as young Diego
- RK Bagatsing as Arnaldo A. Torillo
  - Izzy Canillo as young Arnaldo
- Vin Abrenica as Jepoy Madrigal
  - Azi Villanueva as young Jepoy
- Wendell Ramos as Raul Torillo
  - Joseph Andre Garcia as young Raul
- Sunshine Cruz as Camia Delos Santos-Cruz / Jasmine
- Roxanne Barcelo as Natalie Alcantara
- Yen Santos as Rosana "Ana" Navarro/Fake Lily Cruz
  - Mutya Orquia as young Ana
- Christian Vasquez as Atty. Dante Cruz / Damian "Jaguar" Cruz
- Miko Raval as Marlon Cabrera
- Zsa Zsa Padilla as Helena Montoya / Red Dragon
  - Emmanuelle Vera as young Helena
- Malou de Guzman as Lorena "Loring" Cervantes
- Bodjie Pascua as Leopardo "Pandoy" Cervantes
- Isay Alvarez-Seña as Clarita "Claire" De Guzman
- Ana Abad Santos as Carlotta Navarro
- Chinggoy Alonzo as Sen. Pablo Alcantara
- Jett Pangan as Gov. William Alvarez
- Arnold Reyes as Arthur Vergara
- Shiela Valderrama as Atty. Georgina Fisher
- Richard Quan as Col. Jose Sanggano
- Bobby Andrews as Mateo Ruiz
- Alma Concepcion as Divine Oytengco
- Maika Rivera as Stefanie Oytengco
- Mark Rafael Bringas as John Gonzalez
- Biboy Ramirez as Jude Asuncion
- Nina Ricci Alagao as Mercedes Palacio
- Jun Urbano as Ramon Lim (North)
- Bernard Laxa as Silverio Victoria (East)
- Bong Regala as Carlos Isidro (West)
- Matthew Mendoza as Oscar Evangelista (South)
- Dawn Chang as Maila Lomeda / Ms. Moran
- Jeffrey Santos as Col. Magbanua
- Jong Cuenco as Judge Manuel Lustre
- Michael Flores as Agent Noel Salonga
- Raul Montessa as Fernan Naig
- Ingrid dela Paz as Nimfa Naig
- Vivo Ouano as Raul's ally
- June Macasaet as Raul's ally
- Prince De Guzman as Raul's ally
- Angelo Ilagan as Raul's ally
- Menggie Cobarrubias as Atty. Sebastian
- Justin Cuyugan as Mr. Paterno
- Alex Castro as Rufo
- Carlos Morales as Romulo
- Zeus Collins as Damian's ally
- Luis Hontiveros as Damian's ally
- Lito Pimentel as Cong. Ruel Cansiao
- Richard Lopez
- Alvin Nakassi
- Vanessa Wright
- Kris Janson
- Epy Quizon as Stefano
- Jojo Riguerra
- Johnny Revilla
- Precious Lara Quigaman as Rosario
- Carla Martinez as Hon. Alice Rivera
- Unknown Actor as Maria
- Rodolfo Madrigal Jr. as Portunato "Pot" David
- Anthony Taberna as himself
- Dolores Bunoan as Belen
- Rolly Innocencio as Witness
- Juan Rodrigo as Ramon Montoya
- Victor Silayan as Enrique
- Christopher Roxas as Apollo
- Matrica Mae Centino as Montona
- Allan Paule as Ben
- Gio Alvarez as Ronald
- Tess Antonio as Edna
- Gerald Pizarrras as Efren
- Priscilla Meirelles as Prianka Aguas
- Pinky Amador as Esmeralda De Guzman-Ardiente
  - Ellen Adarna as young Esmeralda
- Karylle as Venus

== Production ==
=== Filming ===
Filming for Wildflower began on December 5, 2016.

=== Casting ===
Danita Paner was the first choice to play the role of Natalie. However, she backed out because she wasn't ready or confident to play the role and also thinking she wouldn't be able to deliver it well during the time of filming. The role eventually went to Roxanne Barcelo.

=== Broadcast ===
Wildflower aired on ABS-CBN's Primetime Bida evening block at 5:45 PM PST, before TV Patrol and worldwide via TFC.

==== Timeslot ====
Wildflower was originally planned to replace the long running drama Doble Kara as part of Kapamilya Gold afternoon block. However, due to the longing request of the fans, the management eventually decided to air the series in the evening block. Two days before the premiere, the timeslot was announced on February 10, 2017.

==== Reruns ====
The first 30 episodes of Wildflower were once made available to watch on YouTube, however at an unknown date, presumably within 2021, they have been made private along with the show's highlights.

Reruns of the show's episodes airs on Jeepney TV.

On March 18, 2020, ABS-CBN announced that Wildflower will also rerun its episodes beginning March 23, 2020, via the network's Primetime Bida evening block, temporarily taking over A Soldier's Heart's timeslot, as part of ABS-CBN's temporary programming changes due to the suspension of tapings in compliance with the community quarantine guidelines done to reduce the spread of the COVID-19 pandemic in the country.

This rerun was abruptly cut due to ABS-CBN being forced to shut down its free-to-air stations following the cease and desist order issued by the National Telecommunications Commission on account of its franchise expiration.

The show became available on Netflix on September 9, 2022, in a condensed format consisting of 2 seasons and 133 episodes.

=== Extension ===
ABS-CBN has announced that Wildflower will be extended until February 9, 2018. The series was said to be extended until March 2018 for Book 4 as announced by Vice Ganda in her late night show Gandang Gabi Vice, but it was pulled out to give way for The Blood Sisters.

Several writers became more involved in the hit series, including Carmela Abaygar, Melchar Escarcha, Arlene Tamayo, Emille Joson, Jones Castro, Carol Navarro, Edeline Romero, Jose Ruel Garcia, and Bridgette Anne Rebuca.

== Reception ==
Kantar Media National TV Ratings (5:45PM PST)
Pilot Episode	Finale Episode	Peak	Average
20.1% February 13, 2017	24.3% February 9, 2018	35.2% October 10, 2017	23.8%

Wildflower became a very controversial series during its run, with its unconventional depiction of Philippine politics, political dynasties, nepotism, political violence, organized crime, schizophrenia and human rights violations, as well as its allusion of events in modern Philippine history on primetime programming, and it even trended on social media. Its pilot episode in 2017 got 20.1%, 5.7% higher than rival show Wowowin. The show peaked in its October 10, 2017, episode with a 35.2% nationwide rating, placing it only behind ABS-CBN's TV Patrol and FPJ's Ang Probinsyano that same night as the country's most watched TV broadcast. The same figure also ranked Wildflower as the country's highest-rated TV show on the pre-primetime slot since the Philippines switched to nationwide TV ratings system in 2009.

The show ended in 2018 notching a final nationwide rating of 24.3% in its finale.

=== Accolades ===
Year	Award	Category	Recipients and nominees	Outcome	Ref.
2017	7th EdukCircle Awards	Best Actress – TV Series	Maja Salvador	Nominated	
2017	31st PMPC Star Awards for Television		Maja Salvador		
2017	31st PMPC Star Awards for Television	Best Drama Actress	Maja Salvador	Nominated	
2017	31st PMPC Star Awards for Television	Best Drama Supporting Actress	Aiko Melendez	Won	
2017	31st PMPC Star Awards for Television	Best Primetime Drama Series	Wildflower	Nominated	
2017	RAWR Awards 2017	Actress of the Year	Maja Salvador	Won	
2017	RAWR Awards 2017	Ultimate Bida	Maja Salvador	Won	
2017	RAWR Awards 2017	Ultimate Kontrabida	Aiko Melendez	Won	
2017	RAWR Awards 2017	Teleserye of the Year	Wildflower	Won	
2017	8th TV Series Craze Awards 2017	Best Primetime TV Series	Wildflower	Won	
2017	8th TV Series Craze Awards 2017	Lead Actress of the Year	Maja Salvador	Won	
2017	8th TV Series Craze Awards 2017	Kontrabida of the Year	Aiko Melendez	Won	
2017	8th TV Series Craze Awards 2017	Most Promising Actor(s)	RK Bagatsing	Won	
2017	3rd (Global Innovative College) Illumine Innovation Awards for Television	Most Innovative TV Actress	Maja Salvador	Won	
2017	22nd Asian Television Awards	Best Actor in a Supporting Role	Tirso Cruz III	Nominated	
2018	2nd Guild of Educators, Mentors, and Students (GEMS) 2017	Best Actress in a TV Series	Maja Salvador	Won	
2018	2nd Guild of Educators, Mentors, and Students (GEMS) 2017	Best Actor in a TV Series	RK Bagatsing	Won	
2018	Bulacan State University Batarisan Awards 2018	Best Female TV Personality	Maja Salvador	Won	
2018	Platinum Stallion Media Awards 2018	Best Primetime TV Series	Wildflower	Won	
2018	Platinum Stallion Media Awards 2018	Best TV Actress	Maja Salvador	Won	
2018	Platinum Stallion Media Awards 2018	Best Supporting Actress	Aiko Melendez	Won	
2018	Platinum Stallion Media Awards 2018	Best Supporting Actor	RK Bagatsing	Won	
2018	Platinum Stallion Media Awards 2018	Trinitian Media Practitioner for Television	Tirso Cruz III	Won	
2018	Platinum Stallion Media Awards 2018	Trinitian Media Personality	Joseph Marco	Won	
2018	Gawad Tanglaw Awards for TV	Best Actress in a Drama Series	Maja Salvador	Won	
2018	Gawad Tanglaw Awards for TV	Best Actress in a Drama Series	Aiko Melendez	Won	
2018	Gawad Tanglaw Awards for TV	Best Actor in a Drama Series	Tirso Cruz III	Won	
2018	Gawad Tanglaw Awards for TV	Best Actor in a Drama Series	RK Bagatsing	Won	
2018	LPU Manila UmalohokJuan Media Awards 2018	TV Drama of the Year	Wildflower	Won	
2018	LPU Manila UmalohokJuan Media Awards 2018	TV Actress of the Year	Maja Salvador	Won	
2018	49th GMMSF Box Office Entertainment Award	Most Popular TV Program Daytime	Wildflower	Won	
2018	49th GMMSF Box Office Entertainment Award	TV Actress of the Year	Maja Salvador	Won	
2018	49th GMMSF Box Office Entertainment Award	TV Supporting Actor of the Year	Tirso Cruz III	Won	
2018	Golden Laurel LPU Batangas Media Awards 2018	Best Primetime Series	Wildflower	Nominated	
2018	Golden Laurel LPU Batangas Media Awards 2018	Best TV Actress	Maja Salvador	Won	
2018	17th Kabantugan Awards (Mindanao State University)	Best TV Actress	Maja Salvador	Won	
2018	4th Alta Media Icon Awards (University of Perpetual Help System- Dalta)	Best Actress for TV	Maja Salvador	Won	
2018	Asian Academy Creative Awards 2018	Best Actress in a Leading Role (National)	Maja Salvador	Won	
2018	Asian Academy Creative Awards 2018	Best Actress in a Leading Role (Asia)	Maja Salvador	Nominated	
2018	23rd Asian Television Awards	Best Actress in a Leading Role	Maja Salvador	Nominated	
2019	Push Awards 2018	Push Female TV Performance of the Year	Maja Salvador	Won	
2019	1st Asia Contents Awards	Best Actress	Maja Salvador	Won	
2019	1st Asia Contents Awards	Best Asian Drama	Wildflower	Nominated	

== See also ==
- The Killer Bride (another series starring Maja Salvador)
- Lavender Fields (similar storyline series, released 2024-25)
- List of programs broadcast by ABS-CBN
- List of ABS-CBN Studios original drama series
- List of programs broadcast by Jeepney TV
