= Belyanka, Belgorod Oblast =

Belyanka Белянка
- Selo
- Location within Belgorod Oblast Location within Russia
- Coordinates: 50°27′N 37°11′E
- Country: Russia
- Region: Belgorod Oblast
- District: Shebekinsky District
- Time zone: UTC+3:00

Belyanka (Russian: Белянка) is a rural locality (a selo) and the administrative center of Belyanskoye Rural Settlement, Shebekinsky District, Belgorod Oblast, Russia. The population was 1,666 as of 2010. There are 10 streets.

== Geography ==
Belyanka is located 29 km northeast of Shebekino (the district's administrative centre) by road. Zimovenka is the nearest rural locality.
