= List of Wildflower episodes =

Wildflower is a 2017 Philippine revenge drama television series directed by Onat Diaz, Cathy O. Camarillo and Raymund B. Ocampo, starring Maja Salvador, together with an ensemble cast. The series premiered on ABS-CBN's Primetime Bida evening block and worldwide on The Filipino Channel on February 13, 2017, replacing Pinoy Big Brother: Lucky Season 7: Mga Kwento ng Dream Team ni Kuya.

The story follows Ivy Aguas, a beautiful and smart heiress who wants justice for the death of her parents by seeking revenge against the evil Ardiente family. Earlier in the show, Lily Cruz is adopted and becomes Ivy Aguas. Afterwards, she reunites with her mother and, once again, becomes Lily Cruz.

National (Urban + Rural) Ratings are provided by Kantar Media. As of February 9, 2018, 257 episodes of Wildflower have aired, concluding the fourth season.

== Series overview ==
Season	Episodes	Originally released	
Season	Episodes	First released	Last released
1	73	February 13, 2017	May 26, 2017
2	54	May 29, 2017	August 11, 2017
3	80	August 14, 2017	December 1, 2017
4	50	December 4, 2017	February 9, 2018

== Legend ==
- Green numbers is the highest rating of the entire series.
- Red numbers is the lowest rating of the entire series.
- Orange numbers is the highest rating per season.
- Blue numbers is the lowest rating per season.

== List of episodes ==
=== Season 1: Greener Beginnings (2017) ===
No. overall	No. in season	Title	Official hashtag	Date Aired	Ratings
1	1	"Blossoms"	#WildflowerBlossoms	February 13, 2017	20.1%
2	2	"Ligalig" (Bother)	#WildflowerLigalig	February 14, 2017	18.9%
3	3	"Lily Takbo" (Run Lily)	#WildflowerLilyTakbo	February 15, 2017	18.5%
4	4	"Sagip" (Rescue)	#WildflowerSagip	February 16, 2017	23.4%
5	5	"I'm Back"	#WildflowerImBack	February 17, 2017	22.1%
6	6	"Unang Sulyap" (First Look)	#WildflowerUnangSulyap	February 20, 2017	22.0%
7	7	"Bitag" (Trap)	#WildflowerBitag	February 21, 2017	21.3%
8	8	"Paghaharap" (Confrontation)	#WildflowerPaghaharap	February 22, 2017	22.6%
9	9	"Lihim" (Secret)	#WildflowerLihim	February 23, 2017	23.2%
10	10	"Linlang" (Fool)	#WildflowerLinlang	February 24, 2017	21.9%
11	11	"Bunyag" (Reveal)	#WildflowerBunyag	February 27, 2017	22.6%
12	12	"Hukay" (Dig)	#WildflowerHukay	February 28, 2017	21.8%
13	13	"Poot" (Madness)	#WildflowerPoot	March 1, 2017	20.0%
14	14	"Bangaan" (Confrontation)	#WildflowerBangaan	March 2, 2017	23.3%
15	15	"Pagwasak" (Wrecking)	#WildflowerPagwasak	March 3, 2017	20.6%
16	16	"Engkwentro" (Encounter)	#WildflowerEngkwentro	March 6, 2017	22.6%
17	17	"Silakbo" (Outburst)	#WildflowerSilakbo	March 7, 2017	22.6%
18	18	"Udyok" (Impulse)	#WildflowerUdyok	March 8, 2017	20.5%
19	19	"Siwalat" (Reveal)	#WildflowerSiwalat	March 9, 2017	23.5%
20	20	"Bugso" (Sudden Gush)	#WildflowerBugso	March 10, 2017	21.3%
21	21	"Reyna" (Queen)	#WildflowerReyna	March 13, 2017	21.4%
22	22	"Sabwatan" (Connivance)	#WildflowerSabwatan	March 14, 2017	21.5%
23	23	"Suspetsa" (Mistrust)	#WildflowerSuspetsa	March 15, 2017	22.3%
24	24	"Sulyap" (Glance)	#WildflowerSulyap	March 16, 2017	22.4%
25	25	"Taguan" (Hideout)	#WildflowerTaguan	March 17, 2017	19.4%
26	26	"Pagdakip" (Arrest)	#WildflowerPagdakip	March 20, 2017	20.1%
27	27	"Paninindigan" (Affirmation)	#WildflowerPaninindigan	March 21, 2017	22.3%
28	28	"Alipusta" (Insult)	#WildflowerAlipusta	March 22, 2017	21.0%
29	29	"Nakaw na Halik" (Stolen Kiss)	#WildflowerNakawNaHalik	March 23, 2017	—N/a
30	30	"Dalaw" (Visit)	#WildflowerDalaw	March 24, 2017	17.7%
31	31	"Ambisyon" (Ambition)	#WildflowerAmbisyon	March 27, 2017	20.6%
32	32	"Labanan" (Fight)	#WildflowerLabanan	March 28, 2017	21.4%
33	33	"Pagkastigo" (Castigation)	#WildflowerPagkastigo	March 29, 2017	18.6%
34	34	"Ebidensya" (Evidence)	#WildflowerEbidensya	March 30, 2017	19.4%
35	35	"Sampal" (Slap)	#WildflowerSampal	March 31, 2017	20.3%
36	36	"Paggising" (Waking Up)	#WildflowerPaggising	April 3, 2017	22.6%
37	37	"Utakan" (Outwiting Someone)	#WildflowerUtakan	April 4, 2017	20.9%
38	38	"Pagsambulat" (Burst)	#WildflowerPagsambulat	April 5, 2017	19.3%
39	39	"Gulantang" (Shock)	#WildflowerGulantang	April 6, 2017	20.4%
40	40	"Paghahanap" (Search)	#WildflowerPaghahanap	April 7, 2017	18.6%
41	41	"Pagbabalik" (Return)	#WildflowerPagbabalik	April 10, 2017	19.4%
42	42	"Sapantaha" (Presumption)	#WildflowerSapantaha	April 11, 2017	19.7%
43	43	"Habulan" (Chase)	#WildflowerHabulan	April 12, 2017	16.6%
44	44	"Pagtatagpo" (Meeting)	#WildflowerPagtatagpo	April 17, 2017	20.7%
45	45	"Hinagpis" (Resentment)	#WildflowerHinagpis	April 18, 2017	18.9%
46	46	"Patunay" (Evidence)	#WildflowerPatunay	April 19, 2017	18.0%
47	47	"Pag-usisa" (To Search For Answers)	#WildflowerPagUsisa	April 20, 2017	19.8%
48	48	"Tuklas" (Discover)	#WildflowerTuklas	April 21, 2017	17.7%
49	49	"Liyab" (Ablaze)	#WildflowerLiyab	April 24, 2017	20.3%
50	50	"Pagdikdik" (Pulverize)	#WildflowerPagdikdik	April 25, 2017	19.9%
51	51	"Gimbal" (Bizarre)	#WidlflowerGimbal	April 26, 2017	18.1%
52	52	"Salisi" (Miss Each Other)	#WildflowerSalisi	April 27, 2017	20.6%
53	53	"Panganib" (Danger)	#WildflowerPanganib	April 28, 2017	18.0%
54	54	"Kaladkad" (Slipshod)	#WildflowerKaladkad	May 1, 2017	20.3%
55	55	"Himagsik" (Rising in a Revolt)	#WildflowerHimagsik	May 2, 2017	20.3%
56	56	"Paglalantad" (Exposé)	#WildflowerExposé	May 3, 2017	23.7%
57	57	"Sidhi" (Intensity)	#WildflowerSidhi	May 4, 2017	20.2%
58	58	"Pasabog" (Surprise)	#WildflowerPasabog	May 5, 2017	22.2%
59	59	"Taktika" (Tactics)	#WildflowerTaktika	May 8, 2017	22.0%
60	60	"Dakip" (Arrested)	#WildflowerDakip	May 9, 2017	21.1%
61	61	"Testigo" (Eyewitness)	#WildflowerTestigo	May 10, 2017	21.3%
62	62	"Pagtutuos" (Arithmetic)	#WildflowerPagtutuos	May 11, 2017	21.3%
63	63	"Sukol" (Resistance)	#WildflowerSukol	May 12, 2017	21.7%
64	64	"Patibong" (Trap)	#WildflowerPatibong	May 15, 2017	21.0%
65	65	"Siyasat" (Investigation)	#WildflowerSiyasat	May 16, 2017	24.6%
66	66	"Traydor" (Traitor)	#WildflowerTraydor	May 17, 2017	23.6%
67	67	"Karibal" (Rival)	#WildflowerKaribal	May 18, 2017	23.9%
68	68	"Paglisan" (Leaving)	#WildflowerPaglisan	May 19, 2017	21.4%
69	69	"Pangungulila" (Bereavement)	#WildflowerPangungulila	May 22, 2017	23.2%
70	70	"Sagupaan" (Clash)	#WildfloweSagupaan	May 23, 2017	23.1%
71	71	"Panghas" (Daring)	#WildflowerPangahas	May 24, 2017	23.4%
72	72	"Pulso" (Pulse)	#WildflowerPulso	May 25, 2017	24.1%
73	73	"Pagsiklab" (Outbreak)	#WildflowerPagsiklab	May 26, 2017	24.2%

=== Season 2: Blackest Ivy (2017) ===
No. overall	No. in season	Title	Official hashtag	Date Aired	Ratings
74	1	"Krimen" (Crime)	#WildflowerKrimen	May 29, 2017	25.0%
75	2	"Katibayan" (Proof)	#WildflowerKatibayan	May 30, 2017	24.8%
76	3	"Hikayat" (Persuasion)	#WildflowerHikayat	May 31, 2017	22.4%
77	4	"Paglansi" (Trickery)	#WildflowerPaglansi	June 1, 2017	23.8%
78	5	"Alinlangan" (Doubt)	#WildflowerAlinlangan	June 2, 2017	21.2%
79	6	"Alok" (Proposal)	#WildflowerAlok	June 5, 2017	22.9%
80	7	"Balatkayo" (Camouflage)	#WildflowerBalatkayo	June 6, 2017	22.4%
81	8	"Salpukan" (Collision)	#WildflowerSalpukan	June 7, 2017	21.8%
82	9	"Puslit" (Unsought)	#WildflowerPuslit	June 8, 2017	23.6%
83	10	"Lihis" (Deviation)	#WildflowerLihis	June 9, 2017	24.6%
84	11	"Peligro" (Danger)	#WildflowerPeligro	June 12, 2017	22.0%
85	12	"Pangako" (Promise)	#WildflowerPangako	June 13, 2017	22.5%
86	13	"Paratang" (Accusation)	#WildflowerParatang	June 14, 2017	22.4%
87	14	"Katunggali" (Enemies)	#WildflowerKatunggali	June 15, 2017	23.3%
88	15	"Sabotahe" (Sabotage)	#WildflowerSabotahe	June 16, 2017	21.2%
89	16	"Pagkanulo" (Betrayal)	#WildflowerPagkanulo	June 19, 2017	22.6%
90	17	"Hinala" (Suspicion)	#WildflowerHinala	June 20, 2017	23.5%
91	18	"Puntirya" (Shot)	#WildflowerPuntirya	June 21, 2017	23.9%
92	19	"Bistado" (Seen)	#WildflowerBistado	June 22, 2017	24.8%
93	20	"Lapastangan" (Hurried)	#WildflowerLapastangan	June 23, 2017	22.2%
94	21	"Alingasaw"	#WildflowerAlingasaw	June 26, 2017	23.9%
95	22	"Arestado" (Arrested)	#WildflowerArestado	June 27, 2017	23.0%
96	23	"Banta" (Threat)	#WildflowerBanta	June 28, 2017	24.9%
97	24	"Pagkutya" (Mockery)	#WildflowerPagkutya	June 29, 2017	23.8%
98	25	"Hagupit" (Attack)	#WildflowerHagupit	June 30, 2017	24.9%
99	26	"Pakana" (Scheme)	#WildflowerPakana	July 3, 2017	25.8%
100	27	"Salba"	#WildflowerSalba	July 4, 2017	25.8%
101	28	"Alitan" (Strife)	#WildflowerAlitan	July 5, 2017	23.2%
102	29	"Pwersa" (Force)	#WildflowerPwersa	July 6, 2017	23.1%
103	30	"Bwelta"	#WildflowerBwelta	July 7, 2017	23.3%
104	31	"Baliw" (Crazy)	#WildflowerBaliw	July 10, 2017	22.9%
105	32	"Hibang"	#WildflowerHibang	July 11, 2017	24.7%
106	33	"Paglantad"	#WildflowerPaglantad	July 12, 2017	23.7%
107	34	"Rebelasyon"	#WildflowerRebelasyon	July 13, 2017	25.0%
108	35	"Pangamba" (Fear)	#WildflowerPangamba	July 14, 2017	23.1%
109	36	"Pagkilala" (Recognition)	#WildflowerPagkilala	July 17, 2017	23.0%
110	37	"Target"	#WildflowerTarget	July 18, 2017	23.8%
111	38	"Palag"	#WildflowerPalag	July 19, 2017	23.0%
112	39	"Pagtugis" (Pursuit)	#WildflowerPagtugis	July 20, 2017	22.6%
113	40	"Tapatan" (Straightforward)	#WildflowerTapatan	July 21, 2017	23.0%
114	41	"Kilabot" (Creeps)	#WildflowerKilabot	July 25, 2017	23.3%
115	42	"Paglaho" (Disappearance)	#WildflowerPaglaho	July 26, 2017	24.9%
116	43	"Pagbihag" (Captivity)	#WildflowerPagbihag	July 27, 2017	25.4%
117	44	"Pagtunton" (Tracing)	#WildflowerPagtunton	July 28, 2017	24.4%
118	45	"Balisa" (Anxiety)	#WildflowerBalisa	July 31, 2017	24.4%
119	46	"Paghadlang" (Opposition)	#WildflowerPaghadlang	August 1, 2017	22.8%
120	47	"Preparasyon" (Preparation)	#WildflowerPreparasyon	August 2, 2017	24.9%
121	48	"Selebrasyon" (Celebration)	#WildflowerSelebrasyon	August 3, 2017	23.1%
122	49	"Lason" (Poison)	#WildflowerLason	August 4, 2017	25.2%
123	50	"Paghayag" (Disclosure)	#WildflowerPaghayag	August 7, 2017	24.5%
124	51	"Pagsumpa" (Oath)	#WildflowerPagsumpa	August 8, 2017	24.9%
125	52	"Wildflower's Wildest Wedding"	#WildflowerWildestWedding	August 9, 2017	28.0%
126	53	"Pagtutol" (Objection)	#WildflowerPagtutol	August 10, 2017	28.2%
127	54	"Sigalot" (Conflict)	#WildflowerSigalot	August 11, 2017	29.3%

=== Season 3: Golden Lily (2017) ===
No. overall	No. in season	Title	Official hashtag	Date Aired	Ratings
128	1	"Arestado" (Arrested)	#WildflowerArestado	August 14, 2017	28.1%
129	2	"Suhol" (Bribe)	#WildflowerSuhol	August 15, 2017	24.9%
130	3	"Selos" (Jealousy)	#WildflowerSelos	August 16, 2017	24.9%
131	4	"Paglaya" (Freedom)	#WildflowerPaglaya	August 17, 2017	23.6%
132	5	"Tiwakal" (Suicide)	#WildflowerTiwakal	August 18, 2017	24.7%
133	6	"Manipulasyon" (Manipulation)	#WildflowerManipulasyon	August 21, 2017	26.3%
134	7	"Pagtangka" (Attempt)	#WildflowerPagtangka	August 22, 2017	26.3%
135	8	"Paggising" (Awake)	#WildflowerPaggising	August 23, 2017	26.1%
136	9	"Katinuan" (Sanity)	#WildflowerKatinuan	August 24, 2017	25.7%
137	10	"Halusinasyon" (Hallucination)	#WildflowerHalusinasyon	August 25, 2017	25.7%
138	11	"Kumpirmasyon" (Confirmation)	#WildflowerKumpirmasyon	August 28, 2017	21.8%
139	12	"Tuso" (Cunning)	#WildflowerTuso	August 29, 2017	23.9%
140	13	"Pagbunyag" (Disclosure)	#WildflowerPagbunyag	August 30, 2017	23.7%
141	14	"Pagkitil" (Capture)	#WildflowerPagkitil	August 31, 2017	26.8%
142	15	"Bilanggo" (Imprisoned)	#WildflowerBilanggo	September 1, 2017	22.7%
143	16	"Shoot To Kill"	#WildflowerShootToKill	September 4, 2017	26.5%
144	17	"Tirador" (Shooter)	#WildflowerTirador	September 5, 2017	24.5%
145	18	"Agaw Buhay" (Dying)	#WildflowerAgawBuhay	September 6, 2017	23.6%
146	19	"Resbak" (Respond)	#WildflowerResbak	September 7, 2017	23.2%
147	20	"Whistleblower"	#WildflowerWhistleblower	September 8, 2017	23.1%
148	21	"Wanted"	#WildflowerWanted	September 11, 2017	27.5%
149	22	"Kaso" (Case)	#WildflowerKaso	September 12, 2017	28.7%
150	23	"Huli" (Caught)	#WildflowerHuli	September 13, 2017	25.8%
151	24	"Dalamhati" (Anguish)	#WildflowerDalamhati	September 14, 2017	26.3%
152	25	"Litaw" (Appear)	#WildflowerLitaw	September 15, 2017	24.5%
153	26	"Harapan" (Face to Face)	#WildflowerHarapan	September 18, 2017	24.6%
154	27	"Laglag" (Ditched)	#WildflowerLaglag	September 19, 2017	25.1%
155	28	"Pandaraya" (Fraud)	#WildflowerPandaraya	September 20, 2017	25.3%
156	29	"Bilangan" (Count)	#WildflowerBilangan	September 21, 2017	26.3%
157	30	"Protesta" (Protest)	#WildflowerProtesta	September 22, 2017	26.2%
158	31	"Duda" (Doubt)	#WildflowerDuda	September 25, 2017	25.8%
159	32	"Bantay Salakay" (Taking Advantage)	#WildflowerBantaySalakay	September 26, 2017	24.6%
160	33	"Pagsilo"	#WildflowerPagsilo	September 27, 2017	27.8%
161	34	"Pag-alma"	#WildflowerPagAlma	September 28, 2017	27.5%
162	35	"Libing" (Burial)	#WildflowerLibing	September 29, 2017	27.7%
163	36	"Saklolo" (Help)	#WildflowerSaklolo	October 2, 2017	27.7%
164	37	"RIP Ivy Aguas"	#WildflowerRIPIvyAguas	October 3, 2017	31.0%
165	38	"Salungat" (Differ)	#WildflowerSalungat	October 4, 2017	29.4%
166	39	"Pangitain" (Omen)	#WildflowerPangitain	October 5, 2017	30.4%
167	40	"Sindak" (Terror)	#WildflowerSindak	October 6, 2017	29.5%
168	41	"Indestructible"	#WildflowerIndestructible	October 9, 2017	33.8%
169	42	"Karma"	#WildflowerKarma	October 10, 2017	35.2%
170	43	"Lily Cruz"	#WildflowerLilyCruz	October 11, 2017	32.0%
171	44	"Red Dragon"	#WildflowerRedDragon	October 12, 2017	31.9%
172	45	"Balakid" (Obstacle)	#WildflowerBalakid	October 13, 2017	29.6%
173	46	"Bomba" (Bomb)	#WildflowerBomba	October 16, 2017	29.3%
174	47	"Buga"	#WildflowerBuga	October 17, 2017	29.0%
175	48	"Koneksyon" (Connection)	#WildflowerKoneksyon	October 18, 2017	28.5%
176	49	"Nawawala" (Missing)	#WildflowerNawawala	October 19, 2017	28.6%
177	50	"Pagkikita" (Meet up)	#WildflowerPagkikita	October 20, 2017	29.1%
178	51	"Kampihan" (Alliance)	#WildflowerKampihan	October 23, 2017	27.9%
179	52	"Maskara" (Disguise)	#WildflowerMaskara	October 24, 2017	29.2%
180	53	"Salakay" (Raid)	#WildflowerSalakay	October 25, 2017	27.3%
181	54	"Sagupa"	#WildflowerSagupa	October 26, 2017	24.1%
182	55	"Komprontasyon" (Compromise)	#WildflowerKomprontasyon	October 27, 2017	23.6%
183	56	"Plastikan"	#WildflowerPlastikan	October 30, 2017	25.6%
184	57	"Durugin" (Crush)	#WildflowerDurugin	October 31, 2017	23.4%
185	58	"Pagkatuklas" (Discovery)	#WildflowerPagkatuklas	November 1, 2017	22.6%
186	59	"Pagsaliksik" (Exploration)	#WildflowerPagsaliksik	November 2, 2017	26.2%
187	60	"Bulgar"	#WildflowerBulgar	November 3, 2017	26.8%
188	61	"Trust Issues"	#WildflowerTrustIssues	November 6, 2017	27.1%
189	62	"Kubli"	#WildflowerKubli	November 7, 2017	27.2%
190	63	"Ngitngit"	#WildflowerNgitngit	November 8, 2017	27.0%
191	64	"Double Cross"	#WildflowerDoubleCross	November 9, 2017	25.9%
192	65	"Laitan"	#WildflowerLaitan	November 10, 2017	25.1%
193	66	"Hayag"	#WildflowerHayag	November 13, 2017	25.1%
194	67	"Balak"	#WildflowerBalak	November 14, 2017	26.1%
195	68	"Panaginip"	#WildflowerPanaginip	November 15, 2017	25.3%
196	69	"Hidwaan"	#WildflowerHidwaan	November 16, 2017	25.9%
197	70	"Pagpaslang"	#WildflowerPagpaslang	November 17, 2017	25.6%
198	71	"Sugod"	#WildflowerSugod	November 20, 2017	25.2%
199	72	"Pighati"	#WildflowerPighati	November 21, 2017	24.7%
200	73	"Paniningil"	#WildflowerPanininigil	November 22, 2017	24.1%
201	74	"Pagpapanggap"	#WildflowerPagpapanggap	November 23, 2017	24.9%
202	75	"Kaalyado"	#WildflowerKaalyado	November 24, 2017	25.8%
203	76	"Lusob"	#WildflowerLusob	November 27, 2017	26.2%
204	77	"Tutukan"	#WildflowerTutukan	November 28, 2017	24.7%
205	78	"Panunumbalik"	#WildflowerPanunumbalik	November 29, 2017	24.4%
206	79	"Gulatan"	#WildflowerGulatan	November 30, 2017	26.0%
207	80	"Piit"	#WildflowerPiit	December 1, 2017	24.8%

=== Season 4: Reddish Endings (2017–18) ===
No. overall	No. in season	Title	Official hashtag	Date Aired	Ratings
208	1	"Pagtakas"	#WildflowerPagtakas	December 4, 2017	24.9%
209	2	"Eskapo" (Getaway)	#WidlflowerEskapo	December 5, 2017	26.2%
210	3	"Tiklo"	#WildflowerTiklo	December 6, 2017	24.6%
211	4	"Baligtad" (Upside down)	#WildflowerBaligtad	December 7, 2017	25.4%
212	5	"Napukaw"	#WildflowerNapukaw	December 8, 2017	23.9%
213	6	"Atake" (Attack)	#WildflowerAtake	December 11, 2017	23.2%
214	7	"Piring" (Plate)	#WildflowerPiring	December 12, 2017	24.7%
215	8	"Tandem"	#WildflowerTandem	December 13, 2017	24.2%
216	9	"Transakyon" (Transaction)	#WildflowerTransakyon	December 14, 2017	24.0%
217	10	"Timbog" (Arrested)	#WildflowerTimbog	December 15, 2017	23.1%
218	11	"Pagmanman" (Monitoring)	#WildflowerPagmanman	December 18, 2017	22.9%
219	12	"Panghihimasok" (Intruder)	#WildflowerPanghihimasok	December 19, 2017	22.4%
220	13	"Bangon" (Get Up)	#WildflowerBangon	December 20, 2017	21.0%
221	14	"Tatag" (Better)	#WildflowerTatag	December 21, 2017	22.4%
222	15	"Pain"	#WildflowerPain	December 22, 2017	20.4%
223	16	"Tagong Yaman"	#WildflowerTagongYaman	December 25, 2017	17.2%
224	17	"Aginaldo"	#WildflowerAginaldo	December 26, 2017	20.6%
225	18	"Pagtatalo" (Contest)	#WildflowerPagtatalo	December 27, 2017	22.6%
226	19	"Basbas" (Blessing)	#WildflowerBasbas	December 28, 2017	21.5%
227	20	"Proposal"	#WildflowerProposal	December 29, 2017	19.1%
228	21	"Kidnap"	#WildflowerKidnap	January 1, 2018	19.9%
229	22	"Preso" (Taken)	#WildflowerPreso	January 2, 2018	23.9%
230	23	"Silo"	#WildflowerSilo	January 3, 2018	22.6%
231	24	"Game Of Death"	#WildflowerGameOfDeath	January 4, 2018	21.8%
232	25	"Kalag" (Loose)	#WildflowerKalag	January 5, 2018	23.2%
233	26	"Mind Games"	#WildflowerMindGames	January 8, 2018	23.7%
234	27	"Pagpuga" (Run Away)	#WildflowerPagpuga	January 9, 2018	23.9%
235	28	"Pagkamuhi" (Hate)	#WildflowerPagkamuhi	January 10, 2018	24.7%
236	29	"Boomerang"	#WildflowerBoomerang	January 11, 2018	25.6%
237	30	"TEN"	#WildflowerTEN	January 12, 2018	25.4%
238	31	"Palit Ulo"	#WildflowerPalitUlo	January 15, 2018	26.5%
239	32	"MagLILYab"	#WildflowerMagLILYab	January 16, 2018	26.4%
240	33	"iLILYbing"	#WildfloweriLILYbing	January 17, 2018	23.2%
241	34	"iLILYgaw"	#WildfloweriLILYgaw	January 18, 2018	22.9%
242	35	"LILYbutin"	#WildflowerLILYbutin	January 19, 2018	22.1%
243	36	"Wedding To Die For"	#WildflowerWeddingToDieFor	January 22, 2018	23.3%
244	37	"Huling Hinga" (Last Breath)	#WildflowerHulingHinga	January 23, 2018	23.4%
245	38	"Panglaw" (Light)	#WildflowerPanglaw	January 24, 2018	24.5%
246	39	"Pakamulat" (Package)	#WildflowerPakamulat	January 25, 2018	22.7%
247	40	"Mass Grave"	#WildflowerMassGrave	January 26, 2018	20.5%
248	41	"Paghusga" (Judgment)	#WildflowerPaghusga	January 29, 2018	20.3%
249	42	"Death March"	#WildlflowerDeathMarch	January 30, 2018	21.9%
250	43	"Pag Aklas" (Uprising)	#WildflowerPagAklas	January 31, 2018	23.0%
251	44	"Pagtaboy" (Coup D'État)	#WildflowerPagtaboy	February 1, 2018	23.4%
252	45	"Bagong Ardiente" (A New Ardiente)	#WildflowerBagongArdiente	February 2, 2018	22.9%
253	46	"GobDiego" (Gov. Diego)	#WildflowerGobDiego	February 5, 2018	22.3%
254	47	"Prayer Vigil"	#WildflowerPrayerVigil	February 6, 2018	22.9%
255	48	"LILYtaw"	#WildflowerLILYtaw	February 7, 2018	23.5%
256	49	"Giyera Na'To" (War Has Been Declared)	#WildflowerGiyeraNaTo	February 8, 2018	23.9%
257	50	"Wildest Ending"	#WildflowerWildestEnding	February 9, 2018	24.3%
