= Voskhod, Zonalny District, Altai Krai =

Voskhod Восход
- Settlement
- Location within Altai Krai Location within Russia
- Coordinates: 52°43′N 84°57′E
- Country: Russia
- Region: Altai Krai
- District: Zonalny District
- Time zone: UTC+7:00

Voskhod (Russian: Восход) is a rural locality (a settlement) in Pleshkovsky Selsoviet, Zonalny District, Altai Krai, Russia. The population was 240 as of 2013. There are 5 streets.

== Geography ==
Voskhod is located 10 km north of Zonalnoye (the district's administrative centre) by road. Oktyabrsky is the nearest rural locality.
