= Voskhod, Khabarsky District, Altai Krai =

Voskhod Восход
- Settlement
- Location within Altai Krai Location within Russia
- Coordinates: 53°31′N 79°27′E
- Country: Russia
- Region: Altai Krai
- District: Khabarsky District
- Time zone: UTC+7:00

Voskhod (Russian: Восход) is a rural locality (a settlement) in Martovsky Selsoviet, Khabarsky District, Altai Krai, Russia. The population was 75 as of 2013. There is 1 street.

== Geography ==
Voskhod is located 14 km southwest of Khabary (the district's administrative centre) by road.
