= Absalyamovo, Uchalinsky District, Bashkortostan =

Absalyamovo Абсалямово Әбсәләм
- Village
- Location within Bashkortostan Location within Russia
- Coordinates: 54°38′N 59°31′E
- Country: Russia
- Region: Bashkortostan
- District: Uchalinsky District
- Time zone: UTC+5:00

Absalyamovo (Russian: Абсалямово, Bashkir: Әбсәләм, Äbsäläm) is a village in Mansurovsky Selsoviet, Uchalinsky District, Bashkortostan, Russia. The population was 89 as of 2010. There are 3 streets.

== Geography ==
Absalyamovo is located 47 km north of Uchaly (the district's administrative centre) by road. Voznesenka is the nearest rural locality.

== Ethnicity ==
The village is inhabited by Bashkirs.
