= Voskhod, Vladimir Oblast =

Voskhod Восход
- Settlement
- Location within Vladimir Oblast Location within Russia
- Coordinates: 56°05′N 41°32′E
- Country: Russia
- Region: Vladimir Oblast
- District: Kovrovsky District
- Time zone: UTC+3:00

Voskhod (Russian: Восход) is a rural locality (a settlement) in Ivanovskoye Rural Settlement, Kovrovsky District, Vladimir Oblast, Russia. The population was 304 as of 2010. There are 7 streets.

== Geography ==
Voskhod is located 46 km south of Kovrov (the district's administrative centre) by road. Otrub is the nearest rural locality.
