= Zalesovo, Altai Krai =

Rural locality in Altai Krai, Russia

Zalesovo Залесово
- Selo
- Interactive map of Zalesovo
- Location of Zalesovo Zalesovo (Altai Krai)
- Coordinates: 53°59′32″N 84°44′57″E
- Country: Russia
- Federal subject: Altai Krai
- Administrative district: Zalesovsky District
- SelsovietSelsoviet: Zalesovsky Selsoviet
- Founded: 1751

Population (2010 Census)
  - Total: 7,820
  - Estimate (2021): 6,538 (−16.4%)

Administrative status
  - Capital of: Zalesovsky District, Zalesovsky Selsoviet

Municipal status
  - Municipal district: Zalesovsky Municipal District
  - Rural settlement: Zalesovsky Selsoviet Rural Settlement
  - Capital of: Zalesovsky Municipal District, Zalesovsky Selsoviet Rural Settlement
- Time zone: UTC+7 (MSK+4)
- Postal code: 659220–659221
- OKTMO ID: 01612426101

Zalesovo (Russian: Залесово) is a rural locality (a selo) and the administrative center of Zalesovsky District of Altai Krai, Russia. Population: 7,290 (2010 census); 7,999 (2002 census); 8,203 (1989 Soviet census).
