= Zalesovsky District =

Zalesovsky District Залесовский район (Russian)
- District
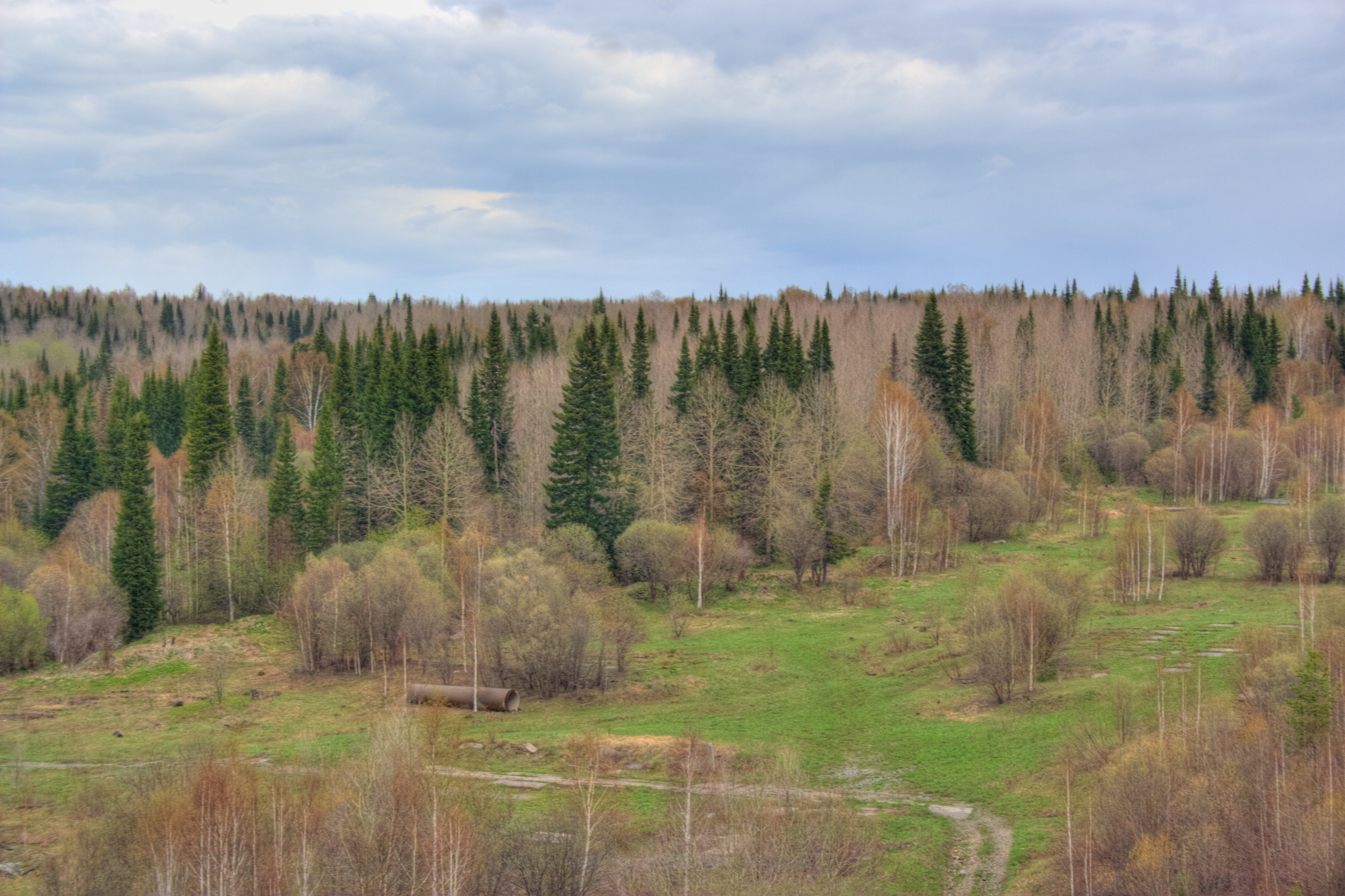
- Taiga in Zalesovsky District

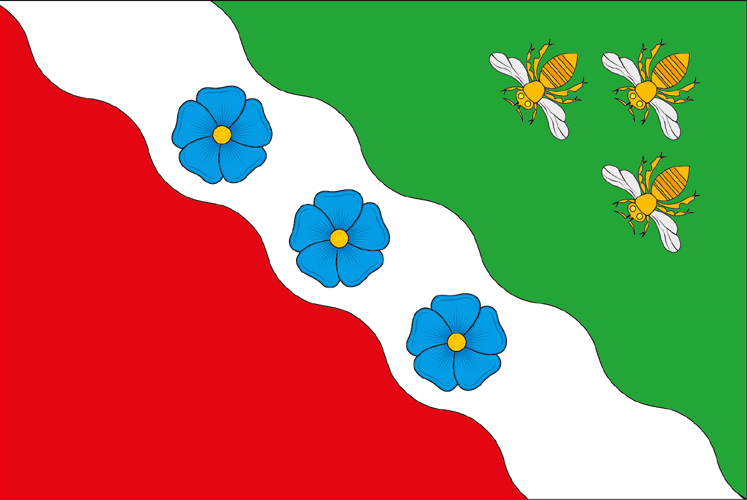
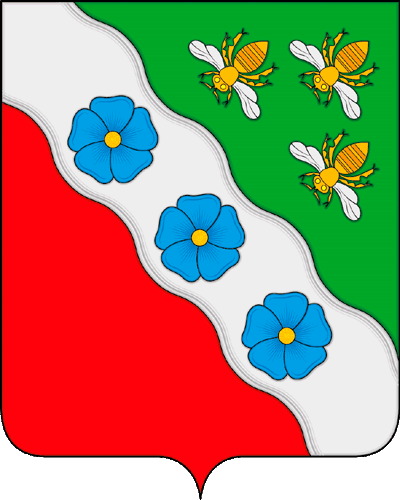
- Flag Coat of arms
- Location of Zalesovsky District in Altai Krai
- Coordinates: 54°00′N 84°42′E
- Country: Russia
- Federal subject: Altai Krai
- Established: 1924
- Administrative center: Zalesovo

Area
  - Total: 3,274 km^{2} (1,264 sq mi)

Population (2010 Census)
  - Total: 15,074
  - Density: 4.604/km^{2} (11.92/sq mi)
  - Urban: 0%
  - Rural: 100%

Administrative structure
  - Administrative divisions: 9 selsoviet
  - Inhabited localities: 22 rural localities

Municipal structure
  - Municipally incorporated as: Zalesovsky Municipal District
  - Municipal divisions: 0 urban settlements, 6 rural settlements
- Website: www.altairegion22.ru

Zalesovsky District (Russian: Зале́совский райо́н) is an administrative and municipal district (raion), one of the fifty-nine in Altai Krai, Russia. It is located in the northeast of the krai. The area of the district is 3,274 square kilometers (1,264 sq mi). Its administrative center is the rural locality (a selo) of Zalesovo. Population: 15,074 (2010 census); 17,714 (2002 census); 20,405 (1989 Soviet census). The population of Zalesovo accounts for 48.4% of the district's total population.
