= Novobelokatay =

Novobelokatay Новобелокатай
- Selo

Other transcription(s)
  - Bashkir: Яңы Балаҡатай
- Interactive map of Novobelokatay
- Location of Novobelokatay Novobelokatay (Bashkortostan)
- Coordinates: 55°42′17″N 58°58′01″E
- Country: Russia
- Federal subject: Bashkortostan
- Administrative district: Belokataysky District
- SelsovietSelsoviet: Novobelokataysky Selsoviet
- Founded: 1804

Population (2010 Census)
  - Total: 5,961
  - Estimate (1 January 1934): 1,635 (−72.6%)

Administrative status
  - Capital of: Belokataysky District, Novobelokataysky Selsoviet

Municipal status
  - Municipal district: Belokataysky Municipal District
  - Rural settlement: Novobelokataysky Selsoviet Rural Settlement
  - Capital of: Belokataysky Municipal District, Novobelokataysky Selsoviet Rural Settlement
- Time zone: UTC+5 (MSK+2)
- Postal code: 452580
- OKTMO ID: 80610422101

Novobelokatay (Russian: Новобелокатай, Bashkir: Яңы Балаҡатай, Yañı Balaqatay) is a rural locality (a selo) and the administrative center of Belokataysky District of the Republic of Bashkortostan, Russia. Population: 5,961 (2010 census); 5,912 (2002 census); 5,270 (1989 Soviet census).
