= Belokataysky District =

Belokataysky District Белокатайский район (Russian)
- District

Other transcription(s)
  - Bashkir: Балаҡатай районы
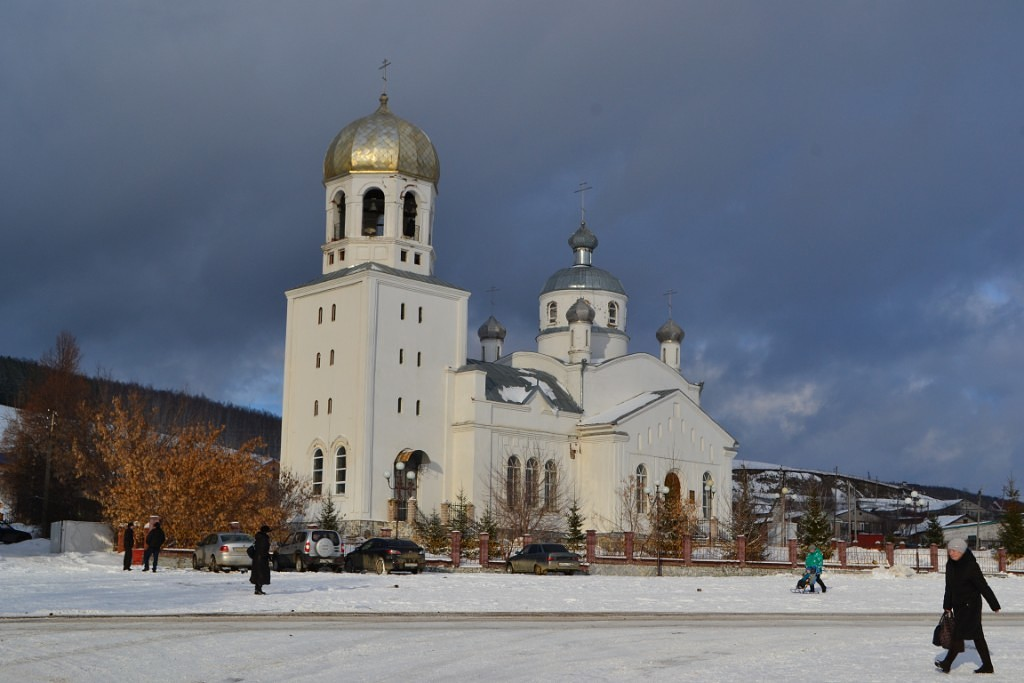
- Church in Village Novobelokatay, Belokataysky District

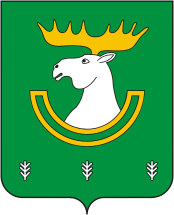
- Flag Coat of arms
- Location of Belokataysky District in the Republic of Bashkortostan
- Coordinates: 55°42′N 58°57′E
- Country: Russia
- Federal subject: Republic of Bashkortostan
- Established: August 20, 1930
- Administrative center: Novobelokatay

Area
  - Total: 3,037 km^{2} (1,173 sq mi)

Population (2010 Census)
  - Total: 20,169
  - Density: 6.641/km^{2} (17.20/sq mi)
  - Urban: 0%
  - Rural: 100%

Administrative structure
  - Administrative divisions: 13 Selsoviets
  - Inhabited localities: 46 rural localities

Municipal structure
  - Municipally incorporated as: Belokataysky Municipal District
  - Municipal divisions: 0 urban settlements, 13 rural settlements
- Time zone: UTC+5 (MSK+2)
- OKTMO ID: 80610000
- Website: http://belokatai.ru

Population of Belokataysky District
- 2010 Census: 20,169
- 2002 Census: 22,623
- 1989 Census: 21,999
- 1979 Census: 24,793

Belokataysky District (Russian: Белоката́йский райо́н; Bashkir: Балаҡатай районы, Balaqatay rayonı) is an administrative and municipal district (raion), one of the fifty-four in the Republic of Bashkortostan, Russia. It is located in the northeast of the republic and borders with Sverdlovsk Oblast in the north, Chelyabinsk Oblast in the east, Kiginsky District in the south, and with Mechetlinsky District in the west. The area of the district is 3,037 square kilometers (1,173 sq mi). Its administrative center is the rural locality (a selo) of Novobelokatay. As of the 2010 Census, the total population of the district was 20,169, with the population of Novobelokatay accounting for 29.6% of that number.

== History ==
The district was established on August 20, 1930.

== Administrative and municipal status ==
Within the framework of administrative divisions, Belokataysky District is one of the fifty-four in the Republic of Bashkortostan. The district is divided into thirteen selsoviets, comprising forty-six rural localities. As a municipal division, the district is incorporated as Belokataysky Municipal District. Its thirteen selsoviets are incorporated as thirteen rural settlements within the municipal district. The selo of Novobelokatay serves as the administrative center of both the administrative and municipal district.
