= Khamitovo =

Khamitovo Хамитово
- Selo
- Location within Bashkortostan Location within Russia
- Coordinates: 53°23′N 58°18′E
- Country: Russia
- Region: Bashkortostan
- District: Abzelilovsky District

Population
  - Total: 676
- Time zone: UTC+5:00

Khamitovo (Russian: Хамитово; Bashkir: Хәмит, Xämit) is a rural locality (a selo) and the administrative center of Khamitovsky Selsoviet, Abzelilovsky District, Bashkortostan, Russia. The population was 676 as of 2010. There are 12 streets.

== Geography ==
Khamitovo is located 75 km northwest of Askarovo (the district's administrative centre) by road. Maygashta is the nearest rural locality.
