= Atavdy =

Atavdy Атавды Атауҙы
- Village
- Location within Bashkortostan Location within Russia
- Coordinates: 53°11′N 58°42′E
- Country: Russia
- Region: Bashkortostan
- District: Abzelilovsky District
- Time zone: UTC+5:00

Atavdy (Russian: Атавды; Bashkir: Атауҙы, Atawźı) is a rural locality (a village) in Yangilsky Selsoviet, Abzelilovsky District, Bashkortostan, Russia. The population was 614 as of 2010. There are 9 streets.

== Geography ==
Atavdy is located 41 km southeast of Askarovo (the district's administrative centre) by road. Davletshino is the nearest rural locality.
