= Almukhametovo (village) =

Almukhametovo Альмухаметово Әлмөхәмәт
- Village
- Location within Bashkortostan Location within Russia
- Coordinates: 53°01′N 58°41′E
- Country: Russia
- Region: Bashkortostan
- District: Abzelilovsky District
- Time zone: UTC+5:00

Almukhametovo (Russian: Альмухаметово, Bashkir: Әлмөхәмәт, Älmöxämät) is a rural locality (a village) in Almukhametovsky Selsoviet, Abzelilovsky District, Bashkortostan, Russia. The population was 659 as of 2010. There are 10 streets.

== Geography ==
Almukhametovo is located 46 km south of Askarovo (the district's administrative centre) by road. Tselinny is the nearest rural locality.
