= Tashtimerovo =

Tashtimerovo Таштимерово
- Village
- Location within Bashkortostan Location within Russia
- Coordinates: 53°28′N 58°40′E
- Country: Russia
- Region: Bashkortostan
- District: Abzelilovsky District
- Time zone: UTC+5:00

Tashtimerovo (Russian: Таштимерово; Bashkir: Таштимер, Taştimer) is a rural locality (a village) in Tashtimerovsky Selsoviet, Abzelilovsky District, Bashkortostan, Russia. The population was 382 as of 2010. There are 10 streets.

== Geography ==
Tashtimerovo is located 22 km northeast of Askarovo (the district's administrative centre) by road. Abzelilovo is the nearest rural locality.
