= Khalilovo =

Khalilovo Халилово
- Selo
- Location within Bashkortostan Location within Russia
- Coordinates: 53°23′N 58°18′E
- Country: Russia
- Region: Bashkortostan
- District: Abzelilovsky District
- Time zone: UTC+5:00

Khalilovo (Russian: Халилово; Bashkir: Хәлил, Xälil) is a rural locality (a selo) and the administrative center of Khalilovsky Selsoviet, Abzelilovsky District, Bashkortostan, Russia. The population was 1,117 as of 2010. There are 15 streets.

== Geography ==
Khalilovo is located 36 km south of Askarovo (the district's administrative centre) by road. Ishbuldino is the nearest rural locality.
