= Ryskuzhino =

Ryskuzhino Рыскужино
- Village
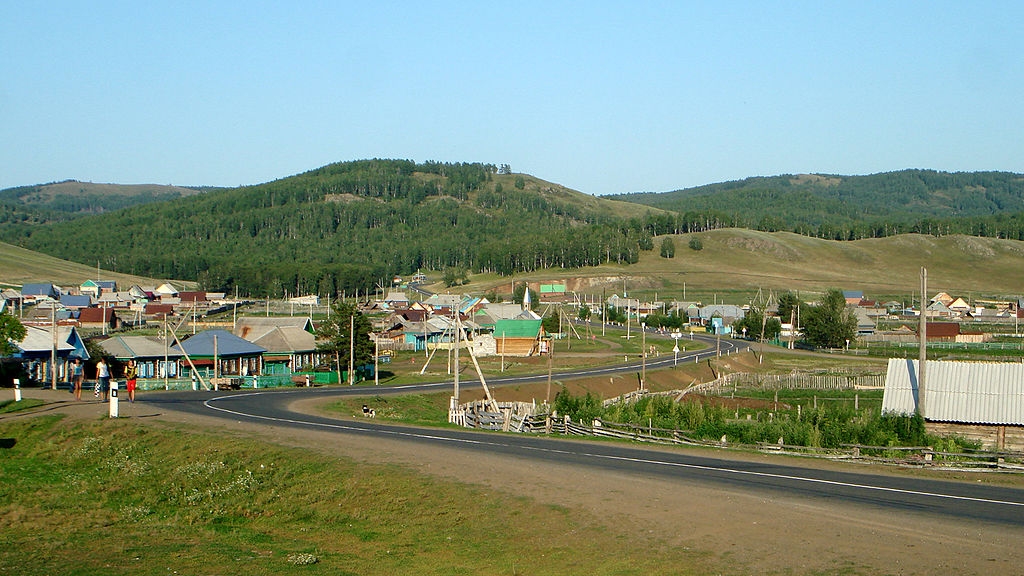

- Location within Bashkortostan Location within Russia
- Coordinates: 53°18′N 58°20′E
- Country: Russia
- Region: Bashkortostan
- District: Abzelilovsky District
- Time zone: UTC+5:00

Ryskuzhino (Russian: Рыскужино; Bashkir: Рысҡужа, Rısquja) is a rural locality (a village) in Amangildinsky Selsoviet, Abzelilovsky District, Bashkortostan, Russia. The population was 453 as of 2010. There are 7 streets.

== Geography ==
Ryskuzhino is located 19 km west of Askarovo (the district's administrative centre) by road. Kazmashevo is the nearest rural locality.
