= Salavatovo =

Salavatovo Салаватово
- Village
- Location within Bashkortostan Location within Russia
- Coordinates: 53°28′N 58°34′E
- Country: Russia
- Region: Bashkortostan
- District: Abzelilovsky District
- Time zone: UTC+5:00

Salavatovo (Russian: Салаватово; Bashkir: Салауат, Salawat) is a rural locality (a village) in Tashtimerovsky Selsoviet, Abzelilovsky District, Bashkortostan, Russia. The population was 323 as of 2010. There are 5 streets.

== Geography ==
Salavatovo is located 16 km northeast of Askarovo (the district's administrative centre) by road. Kuzhanovo is the nearest rural locality.
