= Tuishevo =

Tuishevo Туишево
- Village
- Location within Bashkortostan Location within Russia
- Coordinates: 53°42′N 58°49′E
- Country: Russia
- Region: Bashkortostan
- District: Abzelilovsky District
- Time zone: UTC+5:00

Tuishevo (Russian: Туишево; Bashkir: Туйыш, Tuyış) is a rural locality (a village) in Baimovsky Selsoviet, Abzelilovsky District, Bashkortostan, Russia. The population was 475 as of 2010. There are 6 streets.

== Geography ==
Tuishevo is located 65 km northeast of Askarovo (the district's administrative centre) by road. Baimovo is the nearest rural locality.
