= Yakty-Kul =

Yakty-Kul Якты-Куль
- Village
- Location within Bashkortostan Location within Russia
- Coordinates: 53°34′N 58°37′E
- Country: Russia
- Region: Bashkortostan
- District: Abzelilovsky District
- Time zone: UTC+5:00

Yakty-Kul (Russian: Якты-Куль; Bashkir: Яҡтыкүл, Yaqtıkül) is a rural locality (a village) in Tashbulatovsky Selsoviet, Abzelilovsky District, Bashkortostan, Russia. The population was 418 as of 2010. There are 13 streets.

== Geography ==
Yakty-Kul is located 38 km north of Askarovo (the district's administrative centre) by road. Zelyonaya Polyana is the nearest rural locality.
