= Kirdasovo =

Kirdasovo Кирдасово
- Village
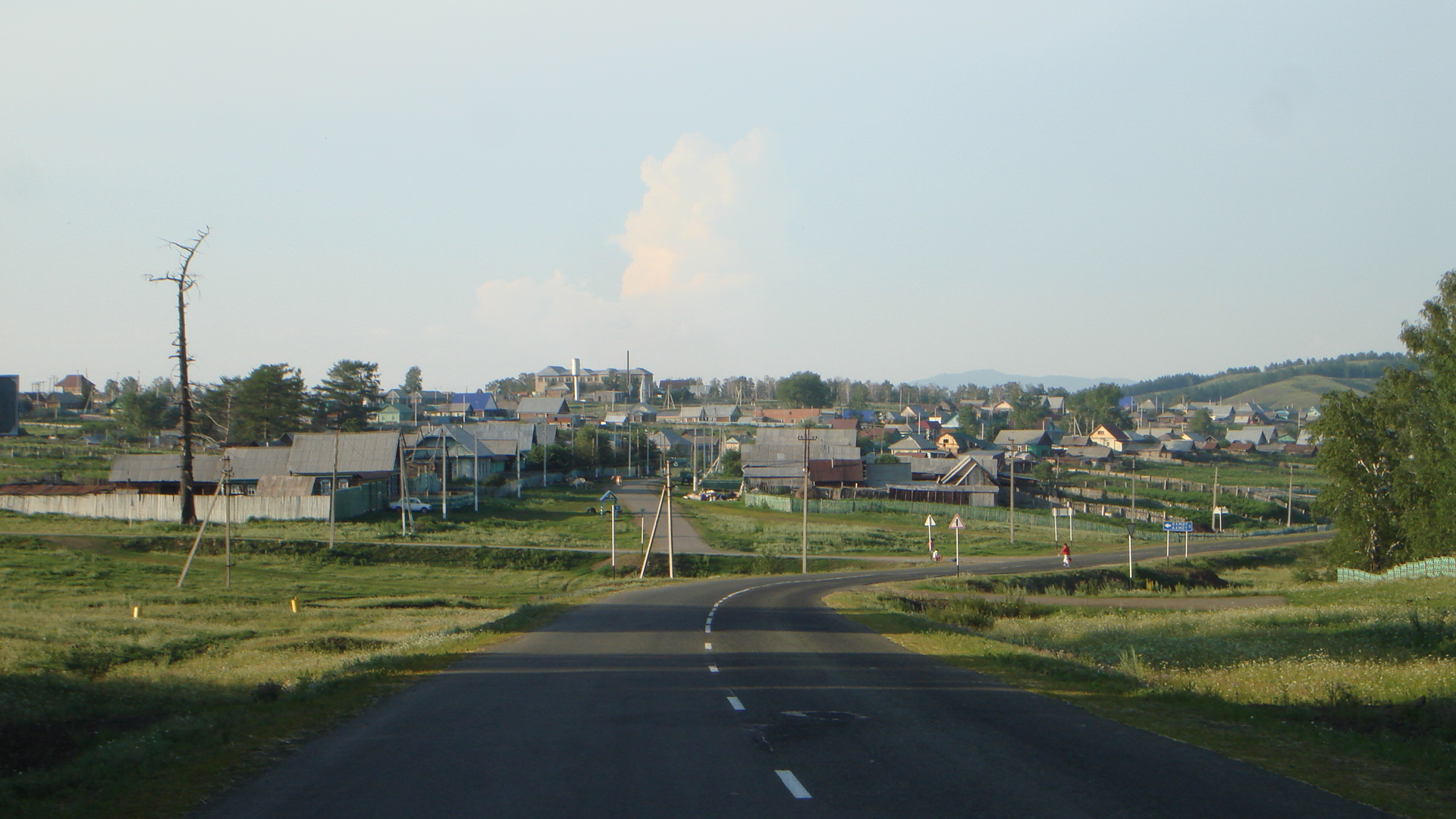
- A view of Kirdasovo from afar.

- Location within Bashkortostan Location within Russia
- Coordinates: 53°13′N 58°15′E
- Country: Russia
- Region: Bashkortostan
- District: Abzelilovsky District
- Time zone: UTC+5:00

Kirdasovo (Russian: Кирдасово; Bashkir: Ҡырҙас, Qırźas) is a rural locality (a village) and the administrative center of Kirdasovsky Selsoviet, Abzelilovsky District, Bashkortostan, Russia. The population was 656 as of 2010. There are 9 streets.

== Geography ==
Kirdasovo is located 25 km southwest of Askarovo (the district's administrative centre) by road. Baymurzino is the nearest rural locality.
