= Almukhametovo (village of station) =

Almukhametovo Әлмөхәмәт станцияһы Альмухаметово
- Village of station
- Location within Bashkortostan Location within Russia
- Coordinates: 53°00′N 58°46′E
- Country: Russia
- Region: Bashkortostan
- District: Abzelilovsky District
- Time zone: UTC+5:00

Almukhametovo (Russian: Альмухаметово, Bashkir: Әлмөхәмәт станцияһы, Älmöxämät stantsiyahı) is a rural locality (a village of station) in Almukhametovsky Selsoviet, Abzelilovsky District, Bashkortostan, Russia. The population was 396 as of 2010. There are 8 streets.

== Geography ==
Almukhametovo is located 54 km southeast of Askarovo (the district's administrative centre) by road. Tselinny is the nearest rural locality.
