= Davletovo =

Davletovo Давлетово
- Selo
- Location within Bashkortostan Location within Russia
- Coordinates: 53°20′N 58°40′E
- Country: Russia
- Region: Bashkortostan
- District: Abzelilovsky District
- Time zone: UTC+5:00

Davletovo (Russian: Давлетово; Bashkir: Дәүләт, Däwlät) is a rural locality (a selo) and the administrative center of Davletovsky Selsoviet, Abzelilovsky District, Bashkortostan, Russia. The population was 941 as of 2010. There are 17 streets.

== Geography ==
Davletovo is located 12 km east of Askarovo (the district's administrative centre) by road. Kusheyevo is the nearest rural locality.
