= Makhmutovo =

Makhmutovo Махмутово
- Village
- Location within Bashkortostan Location within Russia
- Coordinates: 53°07′N 58°32′E
- Country: Russia
- Region: Bashkortostan
- District: Abzelilovsky District
- Time zone: UTC+5:00

Makhmutovo (Russian: Махмутово; Bashkir: Мәхмүт, Mäxmüt) is a rural locality (a village) in Khalilovsky Selsoviet, Abzelilovsky District, Bashkortostan, Russia. The population was 584 as of 2010. There are 7 streets.

== Geography ==
Makhmutovo is located 30 km south of Askarovo (the district's administrative centre) by road. Abdulmambetovo is the nearest rural locality.
