= Avnyash =

Avnyash Авняш
- Village
- Location within Bashkortostan Location within Russia
- Coordinates: 53°16′N 58°45′E
- Country: Russia
- Region: Bashkortostan
- District: Abzelilovsky District
- Time zone: UTC+5:00

Avnyash (Russian: Авняш; Bashkir: Әүнәш, Äwnäş) is a rural locality (a village) in Yangilsky Selsoviet, Abzelilovsky District, Bashkortostan, Russia. The population was 399 as of 2010. There are 6 streets.

== Geography ==
Avnyash is located 35 km southeast of Askarovo (the district's administrative centre) by road. Gusevo is the nearest rural locality.
