= Pervomaysky, Abzelilovsky District, Republic of Bashkortostan =

Pervomaysky Первомайский
- Village
- Location within Bashkortostan Location within Russia
- Coordinates: 53°14′N 58°51′E
- Country: Russia
- Region: Bashkortostan
- District: Abzelilovsky District
- Time zone: UTC+5:00

Pervomaysky (Russian: Первомайский) is a rural locality (a village) in Yangilsky Selsoviet, Abzelilovsky District, Bashkortostan, Russia. The population was 362 as of 2010. There are 4 streets.

== Geography ==
Pervomaysky is located 32 km southeast of Askarovo (the district's administrative centre) by road. Yangelskoye is the nearest rural locality.
