= Abdulgazino =

Abdulgazino Абдулгазино Әбделғәзе Äbdelğäze
- Village
- Location within Bashkortostan Location within Russia
- Coordinates: 53°20′N 58°14′E
- Country: Russia
- Region: Bashkortostan
- District: Abzelilovsky District
- Time zone: [[UTC+5:00]]

Abdulgazino (Russian: Абдулгазино; Bashkir: Әбделғәзе, Äbdelğäze) is a rural locality (a village) in Amangildinsky Selsoviet, Abzelilovsky District, Bashkortostan, Russia. The population was 295 as of 2010. There are 5 streets.

== Geography ==
Abdulgazino is located 30 km west of Askarovo (the district's administrative centre) by road. Amangildino is the nearest rural locality.

== Ethnicity ==
The village is inhabited by Bashkirs and others.
