= Kulukasovo =

Kulukasovo Кулукасово
- Village
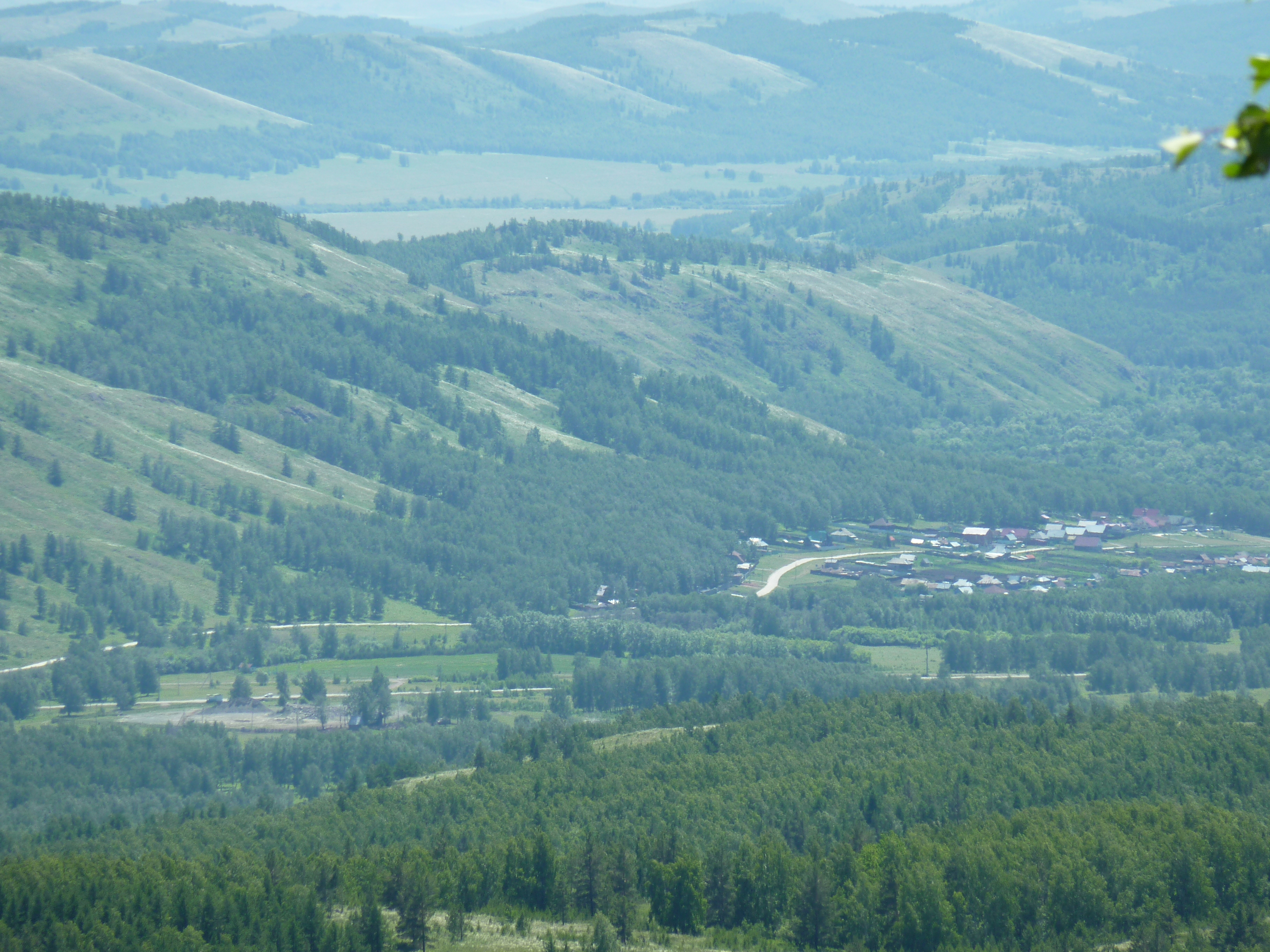

- Location within Bashkortostan Location within Russia
- Coordinates: 53°16′N 58°25′E
- Country: Russia
- Region: Bashkortostan
- District: Abzelilovsky District
- Time zone: UTC+5:00

Kulukasovo (Russian: Кулукасово; Bashkir: Ҡолоҡас, Qoloqas) is a rural locality (a village) in Askarovsky Selsoviet, Abzelilovsky District, Bashkortostan, Russia. The population was 77 as of 2010. There are 3 streets.

== Geography ==
Kulukasovo is located 11 km southwest of Askarovo (the district's administrative centre) by road. Yarlykapovo is the nearest rural locality.
