= Tashtuy =

Tashtuy Таштуй
- Village
- Location within Bashkortostan Location within Russia
- Coordinates: 53°20′N 58°46′E
- Country: Russia
- Region: Bashkortostan
- District: Abzelilovsky District
- Time zone: UTC+5:00

Tashtuy (Russian: Таштуй; Bashkir: Таштуй, Taştuy) is a rural locality (a village) in Yangilsky Selsoviet, Abzelilovsky District, Bashkortostan, Russia. The population was 491 as of 2010. There are 10 streets.

== Geography ==
Tashtuy is located 25 km east of Askarovo (the district's administrative centre) by road. Yangi-Aul is the nearest rural locality.
