= Davletshino =

Davletshino Давлетшино
- Village
- Location within Bashkortostan Location within Russia
- Coordinates: 53°11′N 58°37′E
- Country: Russia
- Region: Bashkortostan
- District: Abzelilovsky District
- Time zone: UTC+5:00

Davletshino (Russian: Давлетшино; Bashkir: Дәүләтша, Däwlätşa) is a rural locality (a village) in Ravilovsky Selsoviet, Abzelilovsky District, Bashkortostan, Russia. The population was 168 as of 2010. There are 4 streets.

== Geography ==
Davletshino is located 31 km southeast of Askarovo (the district's administrative centre) by road. Taksyrovo is the nearest rural locality.
