= Murakayevo =

Murakayevo Муракаево
- Village
- Location within Bashkortostan Location within Russia
- Coordinates: 53°45′N 58°42′E
- Country: Russia
- Region: Bashkortostan
- District: Abzelilovsky District
- Time zone: UTC+5:00

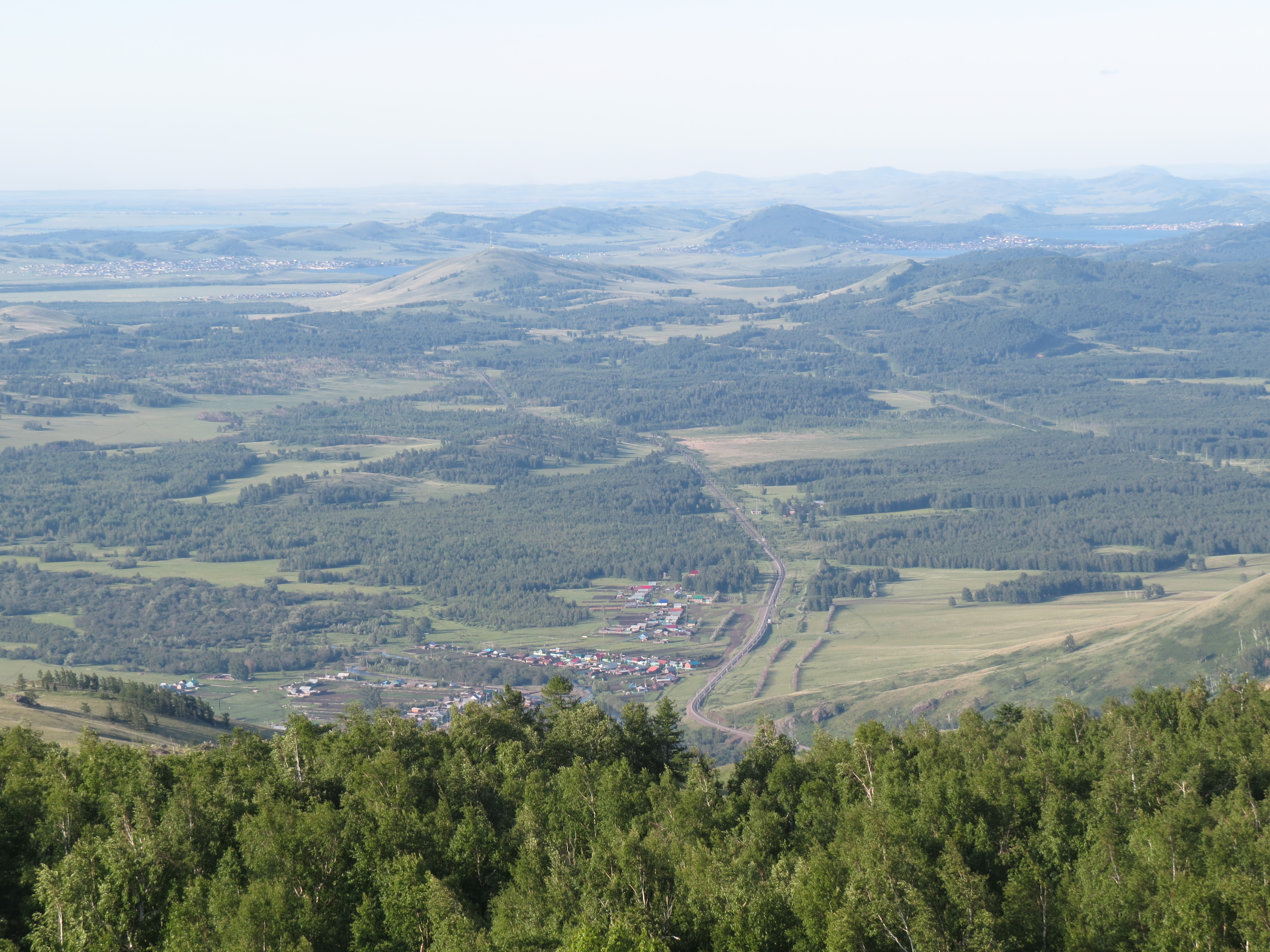
View of Murakayevo

Murakayevo (Russian: Муракаево; Bashkir: Мораҡай, Moraqay) is a rural locality (a village) in Baimovsky Selsoviet, Abzelilovsky District, Bashkortostan, Russia. The population was 329 as of 2010. There are 7 streets.

== Geography ==
Murakayevo is located 73 km north of Askarovo (the district's administrative centre) by road. Novobalapanovo is the nearest rural locality.
