= Taksyrovo =

Taksyrovo Таксырово
- Village
- Location within Bashkortostan Location within Russia
- Coordinates: 53°14′N 58°39′E
- Country: Russia
- Region: Bashkortostan
- District: Abzelilovsky District
- Time zone: UTC+5:00

Taksyrovo (Russian: Таксырово; Bashkir: Таҡһыр, Taqhır) is a rural locality (a village) in Gusevsky Selsoviet, Abzelilovsky District, Bashkortostan, Russia. The population was 398 as of 2010. There are 3 streets.

== Geography ==
Taksyrovo is located 27 km southeast of Askarovo (the district's administrative centre) by road. Gusevo is the nearest rural locality.
