= Iskuzhino =

Iskuzhino Искужино
- Village
- Location within Bashkortostan Location within Russia
- Coordinates: 53°11′N 58°25′E
- Country: Russia
- Region: Bashkortostan
- District: Abzelilovsky District
- Time zone: UTC+5:00

Iskuzhino (Russian: Искужино; Bashkir: Исҡужа, İsquja) is a rural locality (a village) in Ravilovsky Selsoviet, Abzelilovsky District, Bashkortostan, Russia. The population was 145 as of 2010. There are 5 streets.

== Geography ==
Iskuzhino is located 33 km south of Askarovo (the district's administrative centre) by road. Kalmakovo is the nearest rural locality.
