= Kusimovskogo Rudnika =

Kusimovskogo Rudnika Кусимовского Рудника
- Selo
- Location within Bashkortostan Location within Russia
- Coordinates: 53°36′N 58°39′E
- Country: Russia
- Region: Bashkortostan
- District: Abzelilovsky District
- Time zone: UTC+5:00

Kusimovskogo Rudnika (Russian: Кусимовского Рудника; Bashkir: Күсем руднигы, Küsem rudnigı) is a rural locality (a selo) in Tashbulatovsky Selsoviet, Abzelilovsky District, Bashkortostan, Russia. The population was 342 as of 2010. There are 9 streets.

== Geography ==
Kusimovskogo Rudnika is located 45 km north of Askarovo (the district's administrative centre) by road. Geologorazvedka and Zelyonaya Polyana are the nearest rural localities.
