= Aslayevo =

Aslayevo Аслаево Аһылай
- Village
- Location within Bashkortostan Location within Russia
- Coordinates: 53°51′N 58°48′E
- Country: Russia
- Region: Bashkortostan
- District: Abzelilovsky District
- Time zone: UTC+5:00

Aslayevo (Russian: Аслаево, Bashkir: Аһылай, Ahılay) is a rural locality (a village) in Baimovsky Selsoviet, Abzelilovsky District, Bashkortostan, Russia. The population was 397 as of 2010. There are 12 streets.

== Geography ==
Aslayevo is located 87 km north of Askarovo (the district's administrative centre) by road. Battalovo is the nearest rural locality.
