= Starobalapanovo =

Starobalapanovo Старобалапаново
- Village
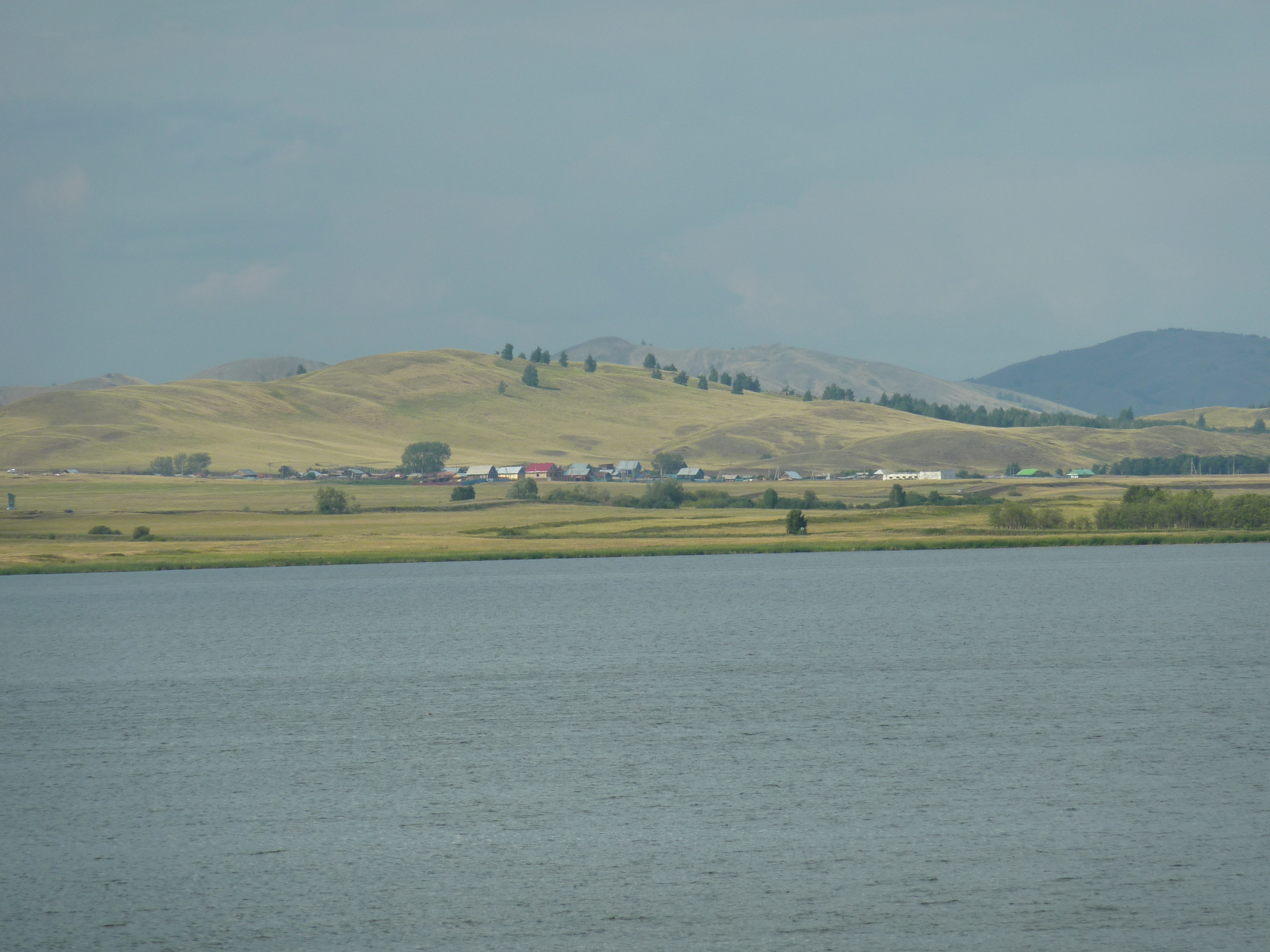

- Location within Bashkortostan Location within Russia
- Coordinates: 53°41′N 58°48′E
- Country: Russia
- Region: Bashkortostan
- District: Abzelilovsky District
- Time zone: UTC+5:00

Starobalapanovo (Russian: Старобалапаново; Bashkir: Иҫке Балапан, İśke Balapan) is a rural locality (a village) in Baimovsky Selsoviet, Abzelilovsky District, Bashkortostan, Russia. The population was 264 as of 2010. There are 5 streets.

== Geography ==
Starobalapanovo is located 62 km north of Askarovo (the district's administrative centre) by road. Tuishevo is the nearest rural locality.
