= Abdulmambetovo, Abzelilovsky District, Bashkortostan =

Abdulmambetovo Абдулмамбетово Әбделмәмбәт Äbdelmämbät
- Village
- Location within Bashkortostan Location within Russia
- Coordinates: 53°06′N 58°32′E
- Country: Russia
- Region: Bashkortostan
- District: Abzelilovsky District
- Time zone: UTC+5:00

Abdulmambetovo (Russian: Абдулмамбетово; Bashkir: Әбделмәмбәт, Äbdelmämbät) is a rural locality (a village) in Khalilovsky Selsoviet of Abzelilovsky District, Bashkortostan, Russia. The population was 576 as of 2010. There are 7 streets.

== Geography ==
Abdulmambetovo is located 31 km south of Askarovo (the district's administrative centre) by road. Makhmutovo is the nearest rural locality.

== Ethnicity ==
The village is inhabited by Bashkirs.
