= Telyashevo =

Telyashevo Теляшево
- Village
- Location within Bashkortostan Location within Russia
- Coordinates: 53°39′N 58°38′E
- Country: Russia
- Region: Bashkortostan
- District: Abzelilovsky District
- Time zone: UTC+5:00

Telyashevo (Russian: Теляшево; Bashkir: Теләш, Teläş) is a rural locality (village) in Tashbulatovsky Selsoviet, Abzelilovsky District, Bashkortostan, Russia. The population was 105 as of 2010. There are 2 streets.

== Geography ==
Telyashevo is located 57 km north of Askarovo (the district's administrative centre) by road. Bikkulovo is the nearest rural locality.
