= Saitkulovo =

Saitkulovo Саиткулово
- Village
- Location within Bashkortostan Location within Russia
- Coordinates: 53°26′N 58°18′E
- Country: Russia
- Region: Bashkortostan
- District: Abzelilovsky District
- Time zone: UTC+5:00

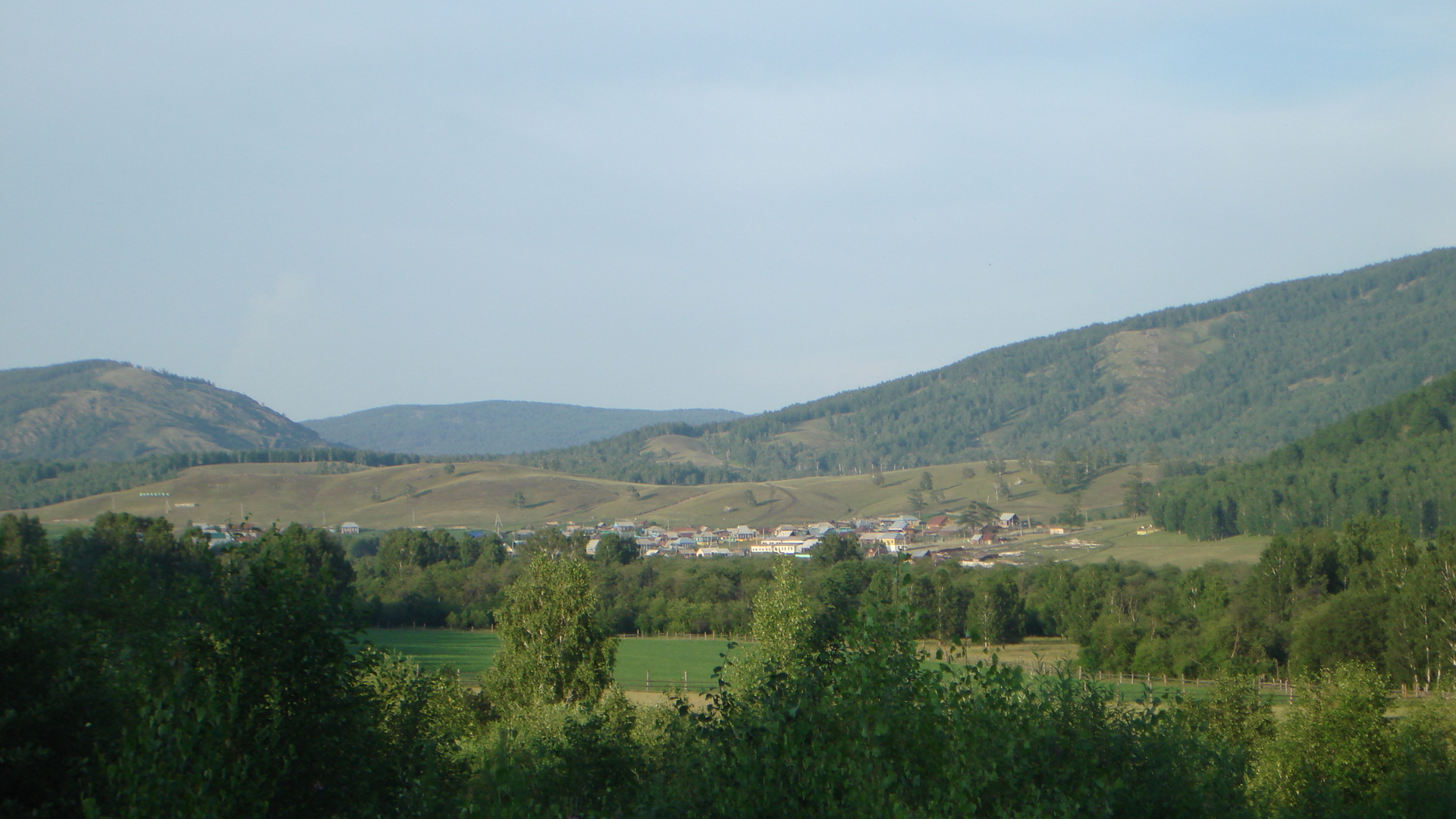
Saikul, Bashkortostan, Russia

Saitkulovo (Russian: Саиткулово; Bashkir: Һәйетҡол, Häyetqol) is a rural locality (a village) in Burangulovsky Selsoviet, Abzelilovsky District, Bashkortostan, Russia. The population was 461 as of 2010. There are 2 streets.

== Geography ==
Saitkulovo is located 36 km northwest of Askarovo (the district's administrative centre) by road. Ishkildino is the nearest rural locality.
