= Novobalapanovo =

Novobalapanovo Новобалапаново
- Village
- Location within Bashkortostan Location within Russia
- Coordinates: 53°44′N 58°45′E
- Country: Russia
- Region: Bashkortostan
- District: Abzelilovsky District
- Time zone: UTC+5:00

Novobalapanovo (Russian: Новобалапаново; Bashkir: Яңы Балапан, Yañı Balapan) is a rural locality (a village) in Baimovsky Selsoviet, Abzelilovsky District, Bashkortostan, Russia. The population was 417 as of 2010. There are 9 streets.

== Geography ==
Novobalapanovo is located 78 km northeast of Askarovo (the district's administrative centre) by road. Yenikeyevo is the nearest rural locality.
