= Kusheyevo =

Kusheyevo Кушеево
- Village
- Location within Bashkortostan Location within Russia
- Coordinates: 53°20′N 58°37′E
- Country: Russia
- Region: Bashkortostan
- District: Abzelilovsky District
- Time zone: UTC+5:00

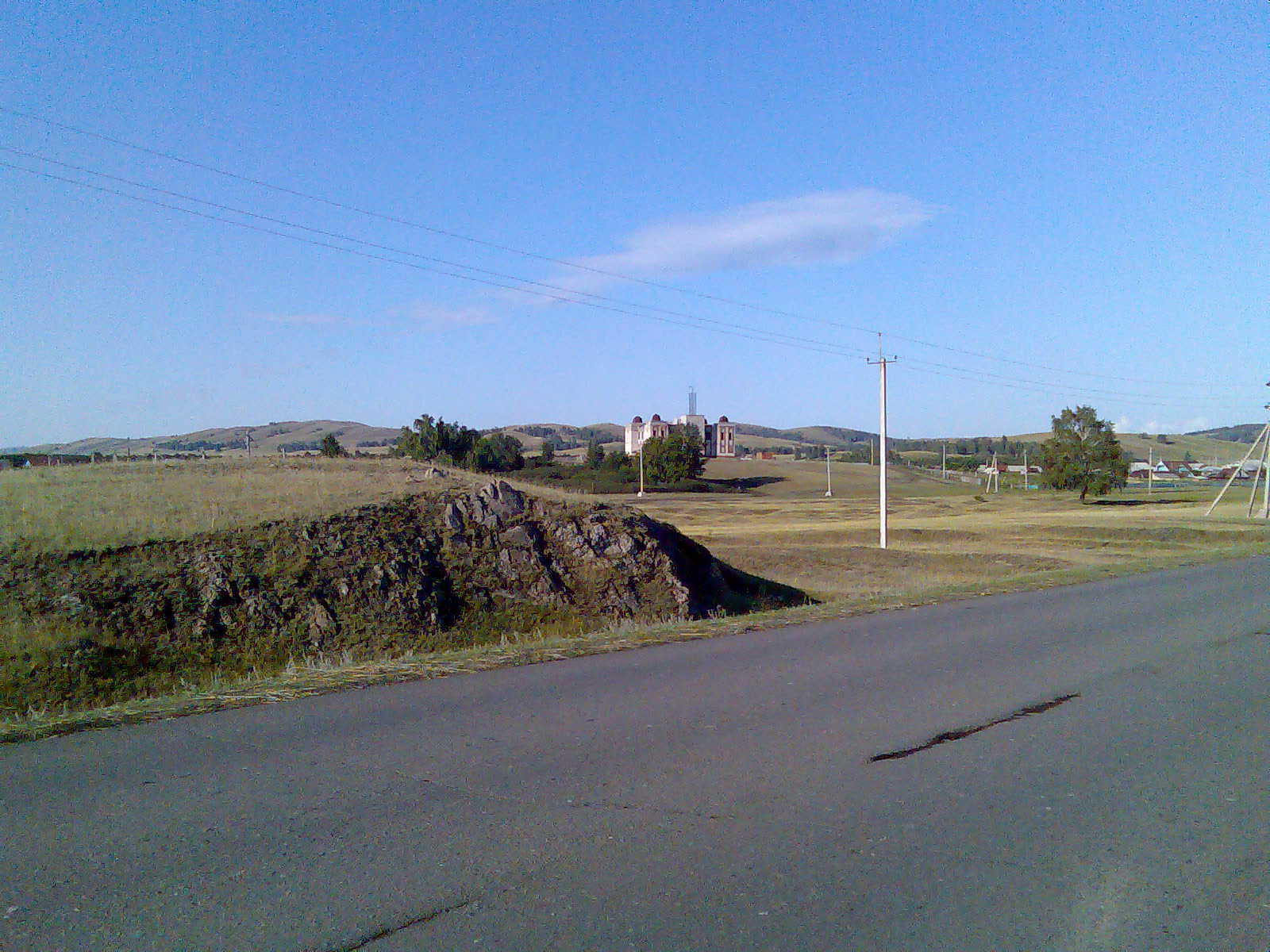
Kusheyevo mosque

Kusheyevo (Russian: Кушеево; Bashkir: Ҡушый, Quşıy) is a rural locality (a village) in Davletovsky Selsoviet, Abzelilovsky District, Bashkortostan, Russia. The population was 374 as of 2010. There are 9 streets.

== Geography ==
Kusheyevo is located 9 km east of Askarovo (the district's administrative centre) by road. Davletovo is the nearest rural locality.
