= Tupakovo =

Tupakovo Тупаково
- Village

- Location within Bashkortostan Location within Russia
- Coordinates: 53°26′N 58°39′E
- Country: Russia
- Region: Bashkortostan
- District: Abzelilovsky District
- Time zone: UTC+5:00

Tupakovo (Russian: Тупаково; Bashkir: Тупаҡ, Tupaq) is a rural locality (a village) in Tashtimerovsky Selsoviet, Abzelilovsky District, Bashkortostan, Russia. The population was 718 as of 2010. There are 7 streets.

== Geography ==
Tupakovo is located 23 km northeast of Askarovo (the district's administrative centre) by road. Abzelilovo is the nearest rural locality.
