= Krasnaya Bashkiriya =

Krasnaya Bashkiriya Красная Башкирия
- Selo
- Location within Bashkortostan Location within Russia
- Coordinates: 53°23′N 58°50′E
- Country: Russia
- Region: Bashkortostan
- District: Abzelilovsky District

Population (2010)
  - Total: 2,435
- Time zone: UTC+5:00

Krasnaya Bashkiriya (Russian: Красная Башкирия; Bashkir: Ҡыҙыл Башҡортостан, Qıźıl Başqortostan) is a rural locality (a selo) and the administrative center of Krasnobashkirsky Selsoviet, Abzelilovsky District, Bashkortostan, Russia. The population was 2,435 as of 2010. There are 36 streets.

== Geography ==
Krasnaya Bashkiriya is located 29 km northeast of Askarovo (the district's administrative centre) by road. Magnitogorsk is the nearest rural locality.
