= Amangildino =

Amangildino Амангильдино Амангилде
- Selo
- Location within Bashkortostan Location within Russia
- Coordinates: 53°21′N 58°18′E
- Country: Russia
- Region: Bashkortostan
- District: Abzelilovsky District
- Time zone: UTC+5:00

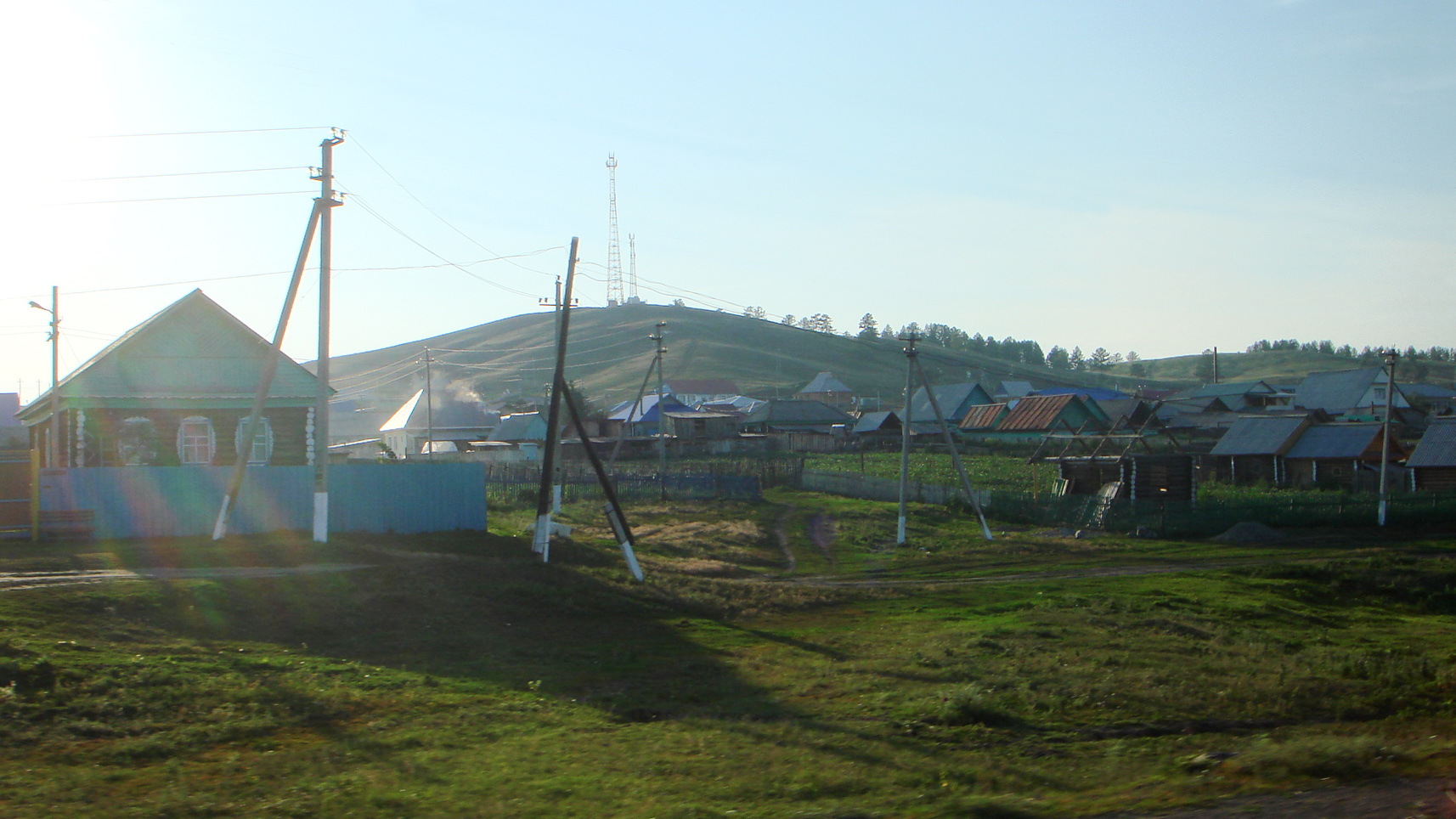

Amangildino (Russian: Амангильдино, Bashkir: Амангилде, Amangilde) is a rural locality (a selo) and the administrative center of Amangildinsky Selsoviet, Abzelilovsky District, Bashkortostan, Russia. The population was 651 as of 2010. There are 10 streets.

== Geography ==
Amangildino is located 25 km west of Askarovo (the district's administrative centre) by road. Kazmashevo is the nearest rural locality.
