= Khusainovo =

Khusainovo Хусаиново
- Village
- Location within Bashkortostan Location within Russia
- Coordinates: 53°05′N 58°26′E
- Country: Russia
- Region: Bashkortostan
- District: Abzelilovsky District
- Time zone: UTC+5:00

Khusainovo (Russian: Хусаиново; Bashkir: Хөсәйен, Xösäyen) is a rural locality (a village) in Khalilovsky Selsoviet, Abzelilovsky District, Bashkortostan, Russia. The population was 23 as of 2010. There are 2 streets.

== Geography ==
Khusainovo is located 41 km south of Askarovo (the district's administrative centre) by road. Abdulmambetovo is the nearest rural locality.
