= Kazmashevo =

Kazmashevo Казмашево
- Village
- Location within Bashkortostan Location within Russia
- Coordinates: 53°18′N 58°18′E
- Country: Russia
- Region: Bashkortostan
- District: Abzelilovsky District
- Time zone: UTC+5:00

Kazmashevo (Russian: Казмашево; Bashkir: Ҡаҙмаш, Qaźmaş) is a rural locality (a village) in Amangildinsky Selsoviet, Abzelilovsky District, Bashkortostan, Russia. The population was 538 as of 2010. There are 8 streets.

== Geography ==
Kazmashevo is located 22 km west of Askarovo (the district's administrative centre) by road. Ryskuzhino is the nearest rural locality.
