= Geologorazvedka, Republic of Bashkortostan =

Geologorazvedka Геологоразведка
- Village
- Location within Bashkortostan Location within Russia
- Coordinates: 53°36′N 58°40′E
- Country: Russia
- Region: Bashkortostan
- District: Abzelilovsky District
- Time zone: UTC+5:00

Geologorazvedka (Russian: Геологоразведка) is a rural locality (a village) in Tashbulatovsky Selsoviet, Abzelilovsky District, Bashkortostan, Russia. The population was 350 as of 2010. There are 6 streets.

== Geography ==
Geologorazvedka is located 46 km north of Askarovo (the district's administrative centre) by road. Tashbulatovo is the nearest rural locality.
