= Sukhoye Ozero =

Sukhoye Ozero Сухое Озеро
- Village
- Location within Bashkortostan Location within Russia
- Coordinates: 53°08′N 58°52′E
- Country: Russia
- Region: Bashkortostan
- District: Abzelilovsky District
- Time zone: UTC+5:00

Sukhoye Ozero (Russian: Сухое Озеро) is a rural locality (a village) in Almukhametovsky Selsoviet, Abzelilovsky District, Bashkortostan, Russia. The population was 14 as of 2010. There is 1 street.

== Geography ==
Sukhoye Ozero is located 48 km southeast of Askarovo (the district's administrative centre) by road. Severny is the nearest rural locality.
