= Yaykarovo =

Yaykarovo Яйкарово
- Village
- Location within Bashkortostan Location within Russia
- Coordinates: 53°47′N 58°51′E
- Country: Russia
- Region: Bashkortostan
- District: Abzelilovsky District
- Time zone: UTC+5:00

Yaykarovo (Russian: Яйкарово; Bashkir: Яйҡар, Yayqar) is a rural locality (a village) in Baimovsky Selsoviet, Abzelilovsky District, Bashkortostan, Russia. The population was 157 as of 2010. There are 6 streets.

== Geography ==
Yaykarovo is located 76 km north of Askarovo (the district's administrative centre) by road. Rakhmetovo is the nearest rural locality.
