= Ishkulovo =

Ishkulovo Ишкулово
- Selo
- Location within Bashkortostan Location within Russia
- Coordinates: 53°09′N 58°32′E
- Country: Russia
- Region: Bashkortostan
- District: Abzelilovsky District
- Time zone: UTC+5:00

Ishkulovo (Russian: Ишкулово; Bashkir: Ишҡол, İşqol) is a rural locality (a selo) and the administrative center of Ravilovsky Selsoviet, Abzelilovsky District, Bashkortostan, Russia. The population was 1,257 as of 2010. There are 11 streets.

== Geography ==
Ishkulovo is located 23 km south of Askarovo (the district's administrative centre) by road. Tepyanovo is the nearest rural locality.
