= Tashbulatovo =

Tashbulatovo Ташбулатово
- Selo
- Location within Bashkortostan Location within Russia
- Coordinates: 53°37′N 58°42′E
- Country: Russia
- Region: Bashkortostan
- District: Abzelilovsky District
- Time zone: UTC+5:00

Tashbulatovo (Russian: Ташбулатово; Bashkir: Ташбулат, Taşbulat) is a rural locality (a selo) and the administrative center of Tashbulatovsky Selsoviet, Abzelilovsky District, Bashkortostan, Russia. The population was 1,277 as of 2010. There are 20 streets.

== Geography ==
Tashbulatovo is located 48 km north of Askarovo (the district's administrative centre) by road. Geologorazvedka is the nearest rural locality.
