= Yenikeyevo =

Yenikeyevo Еникеево
- Village
- Location within Bashkortostan Location within Russia
- Coordinates: 53°45′N 58°47′E
- Country: Russia
- Region: Bashkortostan
- District: Abzelilovsky District
- Time zone: UTC+5:00

Yenikeyevo (Russian: Еникеево; Bashkir: Йәнекәй, Yänekäy) is a rural locality (a village) in Baimovsky Selsoviet, Abzelilovsky District, Bashkortostan, Russia. The population was 293 as of 2010. There are 6 streets.

== Geography ==
Yenikeyevo is located 73 km north of Askarovo (the district's administrative centre) by road. Novobalapanovo is the nearest rural locality.
