= Nizhneye Abdryashevo =

Nizhneye Abdryashevo Нижнее Абдряшево
- Village
- Location within Bashkortostan Location within Russia
- Coordinates: 52°56′N 58°45′E
- Country: Russia
- Region: Bashkortostan
- District: Abzelilovsky District
- Time zone: UTC+5:00

Nizhneye Abdryashevo (Russian: Нижнее Абдряшево; Bashkir: Түбәнге Әбдрәш, Tübänge Äbdräş) is a rural locality (a village) in Almukhametovsky Selsoviet, Abzelilovsky District, Bashkortostan, Russia. The population was 67 as of 2010. There is 1 street.

== Geography ==
Nizhneye Abdryashevo is located 64 km south of Askarovo (the district's administrative centre) by road. Verkhneye Abdryashevo is the nearest rural locality.
