= Idyash-Kuskarovo =

Idyash-Kuskarovo Идяш-Кускарово
- Village
- Location within Bashkortostan Location within Russia
- Coordinates: 53°14′N 58°29′E
- Country: Russia
- Region: Bashkortostan
- District: Abzelilovsky District
- Time zone: UTC+5:00

Idyash-Kuskarovo (Russian: Идяш-Кускарово; Bashkir: Иҙәш Ҡусҡары, İźäş Qusqarı) is a rural locality (a village) in Gusevsky Selsoviet, Abzelilovsky District, Bashkortostan, Russia. The population was 203 as of 2010. There are 5 streets.

== Geography ==
Idyash-Kuskarovo is located 12 km south of Askarovo (the district's administrative centre) by road. Tal-Kuskarovo is the nearest rural locality.
