= Bolshegabdinovo =

Bolshegabdinovo Большегабдиново
- Village
- Location within Bashkortostan Location within Russia
- Coordinates: 53°44′N 58°49′E
- Country: Russia
- Region: Bashkortostan
- District: Abzelilovsky District
- Time zone: UTC+5:00

Bolshegabdinovo (Russian: Большегабдиново; Bashkir: Оло Ғәбдин, Olo Ğäbdin) is a rural locality (a village) in Baimovsky Selsoviet, Abzelilovsky District, Bashkortostan, Russia. The population was 180 as of 2010. There are 2 streets.

== Geography ==
Bolshegabdinovo is located 68 km northeast of Askarovo (the district's administrative centre) by road. Baimovo is the nearest rural locality.
