= Sharipovo =

Sharipovo Шарипово
- Village
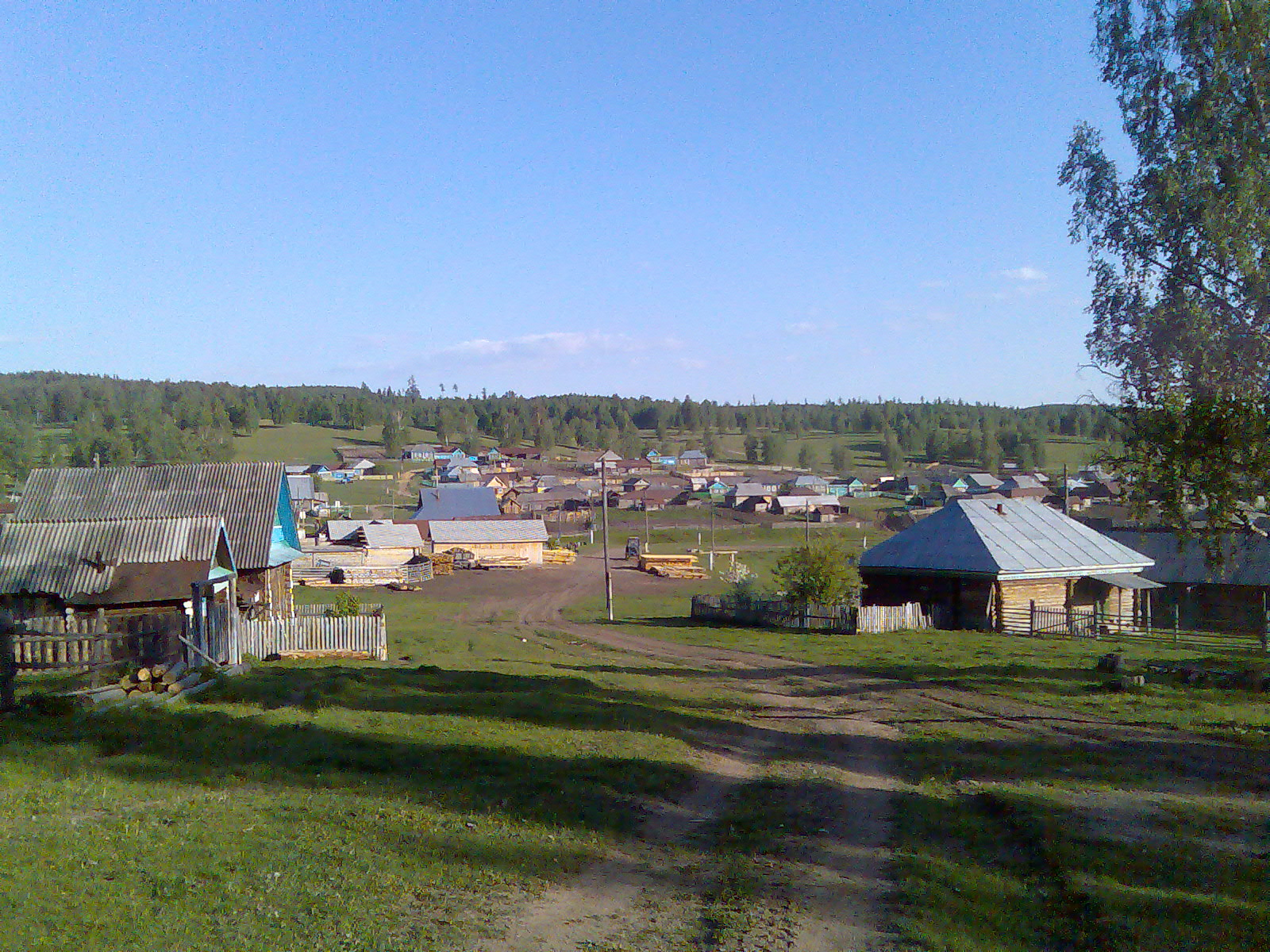

- Location within Bashkortostan Location within Russia
- Coordinates: 53°35′N 58°07′E
- Country: Russia
- Region: Bashkortostan
- District: Abzelilovsky District
- Time zone: UTC+5:00

Sharipovo (Russian: Шарипово; Bashkir: Шәрип, Şärip) is a rural locality (a village) in Khamitovsky Selsoviet, Abzelilovsky District, Bashkortostan, Russia. The population was 241 as of 2010. There are 6 streets.

== Geography ==
Sharipovo is located 64 km northwest of Askarovo (the district's administrative centre) by road. Maygashta is the nearest rural locality.
