= Kusimovo =

Kusimovo Кусимово
- Village
- Location within Bashkortostan Location within Russia
- Coordinates: 53°37′N 58°36′E
- Country: Russia
- Region: Bashkortostan
- District: Abzelilovsky District
- Time zone: UTC+5:00

Kusimovo (Russian: Кусимово; Bashkir: Күсем, Küsem) is a rural locality (a village) in Tashbulatovsky Selsoviet, Abzelilovsky District, Bashkortostan, Russia. The population was 419 as of 2010. There are 14 streets.

== Geography ==
Kusimovo is located 43 km north of Askarovo (the district's administrative centre) by road. Zelyonaya Polyana is the nearest rural locality.
