= Niyazgulovo =

Niyazgulovo Ниязгулово
- Village
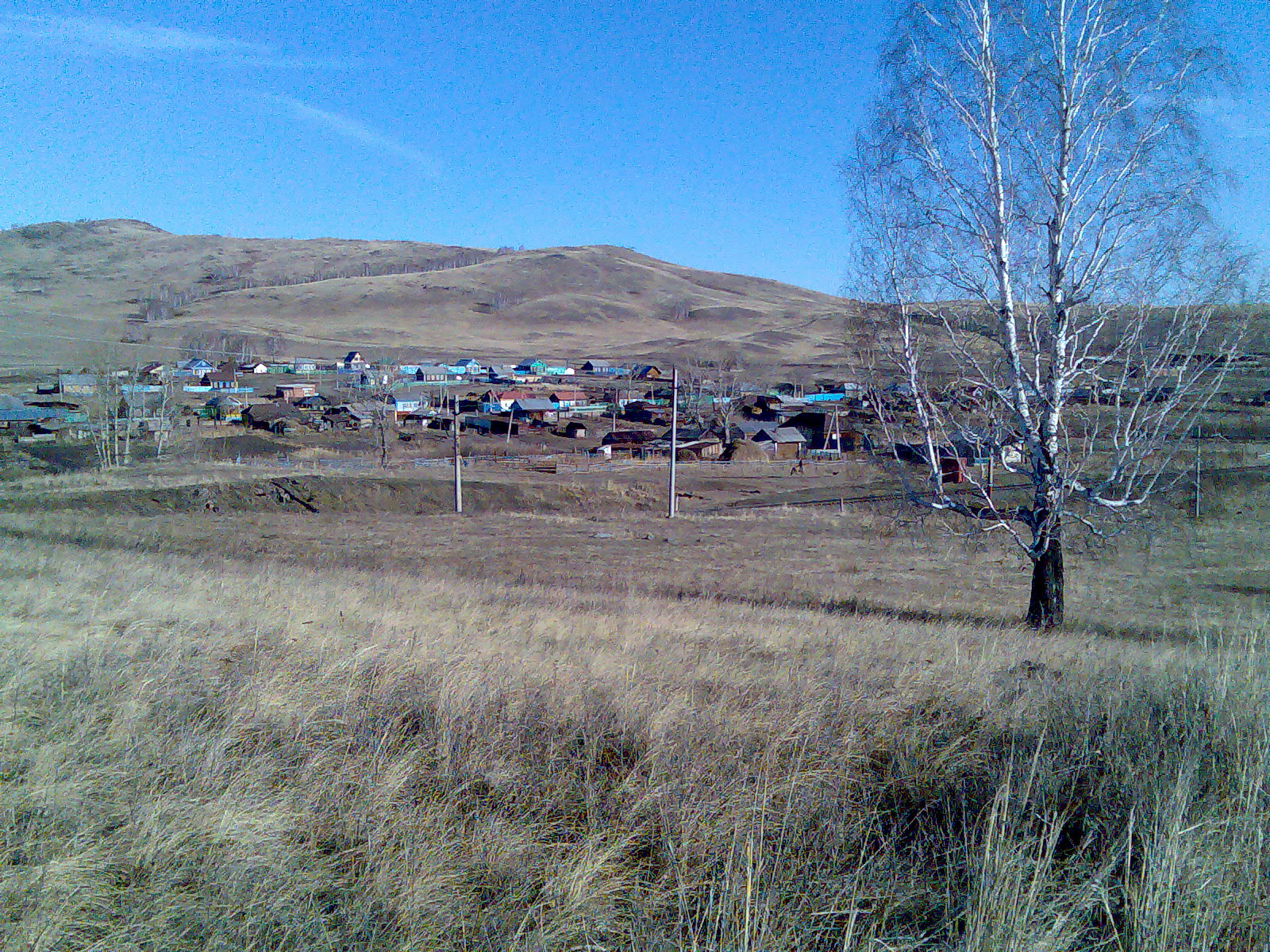
- The village of Niyazgulovo

- Location within Bashkortostan Location within Russia
- Coordinates: 53°42′N 58°43′E
- Country: Russia
- Region: Bashkortostan
- District: Abzelilovsky District
- Time zone: UTC+5:00

Niyazgulovo (Russian: Ниязгулово; Bashkir: Нияҙғол, Niyaźğol) is a rural locality (a village) in Tashbulatovsky Selsoviet, Abzelilovsky District, Bashkortostan, Russia. The population was 168 as of 2010. There are 8 streets.

== Geography ==
Niyazgulovo is located 69 km northeast of Askarovo (the district's administrative centre) by road. Novobalapanovo is the nearest rural locality.
