= Ravilovo =

Ravilovo Равилово
- Village
- Location within Bashkortostan Location within Russia
- Coordinates: 53°12′N 58°31′E
- Country: Russia
- Region: Bashkortostan
- District: Abzelilovsky District
- Time zone: UTC+5:00

Ravilovo (Russian: Равилово; Bashkir: Рауил, Rawil) is a rural locality (village) in Ravilovsky Selsoviet, Abzelilovsky District, Bashkortostan, Russia. The population was 494 as of 2010. There are 7 streets.

== Geography ==
Ravilovo is located 17 km south of Askarovo (the district's administrative centre) by road. Ishkulovo is the nearest rural locality.
