= Baimovo =

Baimovo Баимово Байым
- Selo
- Location within Bashkortostan Location within Russia
- Coordinates: 53°43′N 58°50′E
- Country: Russia
- Region: Bashkortostan
- District: Abzelilovsky District
- Time zone: UTC+5:00

Baimovo (Russian: Баимово, Bashkir: Байым, Bayım) is a rural locality (a selo) and the administrative center of Baimovskoye Rural Settlement, Abzelilovsky District, Bashkortostan, Russia. The population was 1,015 as of 2010. There are 15 streets.

== Geography ==
Baimovo is located 66 km northeast of Askarovo (the district's administrative centre) by road. Tuishevo is the nearest rural locality.
