= Tirmen, Republic of Bashkortostan =

Tirmen Тирмен
- Village
- Location within Bashkortostan Location within Russia
- Coordinates: 53°16′N 58°22′E
- Country: Russia
- Region: Bashkortostan
- District: Abzelilovsky District
- Time zone: UTC+5:00

Tirmen (Russian: Тирмен; Bashkir: Тирмән, Tirmän) is a rural locality (a village) in Askarovsky Selsoviet, Abzelilovsky District, Bashkortostan, Russia. The population was 13 as of 2010. There are 2 streets.

== Geography ==
Tirmen is located 14 km southwest of Askarovo (the district's administrative centre) by road. Kulukasovo is the nearest rural locality.
