= Iskakovo =

Iskakovo Искаково
- Village
- Location within Bashkortostan Location within Russia
- Coordinates: 53°29′N 58°20′E
- Country: Russia
- Region: Bashkortostan
- District: Abzelilovsky District
- Time zone: UTC+5:00

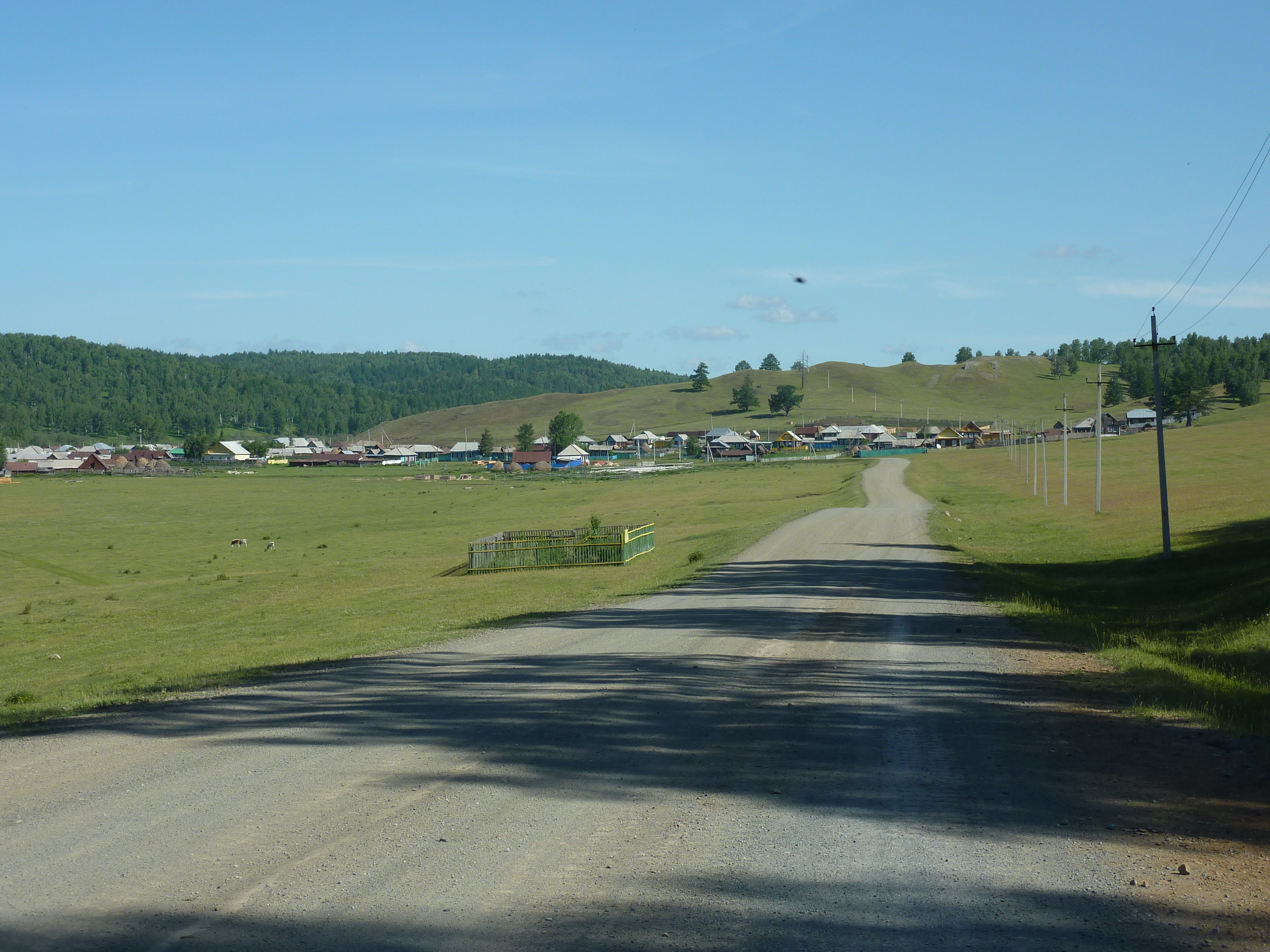

Iskakovo (Russian: Искаково; Bashkir: Исҡаҡ, İsqaq) is a rural locality (a village) in Burangulovsky Selsoviet, Abzelilovsky District, Bashkortostan, Russia. The population was 178 as of 2010. There are three streets.

== Geography ==
Iskakovo is located 43 km (27 mi) northwest of Askarovo (the district's administrative centre) by road. Burangulovo is the nearest rural locality.
