= Tepyanovo =

Tepyanovo Тепяново
- Village
- Location within Bashkortostan Location within Russia
- Coordinates: 53°08′N 58°33′E
- Country: Russia
- Region: Bashkortostan
- District: Abzelilovsky District
- Time zone: UTC+5:00

Tepyanovo (Russian: Тепяново; Bashkir: Тәпән, Täpän) is a rural locality (a village) in Ravilovsky Selsoviet, Abzelilovsky District, Bashkortostan, Russia. The population was 316 as of 2010. There are 6 streets.

== Geography ==
Tepyanovo is located 25 km south of Askarovo (the district's administrative centre) by road. Makhmutovo is the nearest rural locality.
