= Yarlykapovo =

Yarlykapovo Ярлыкапово
- Village
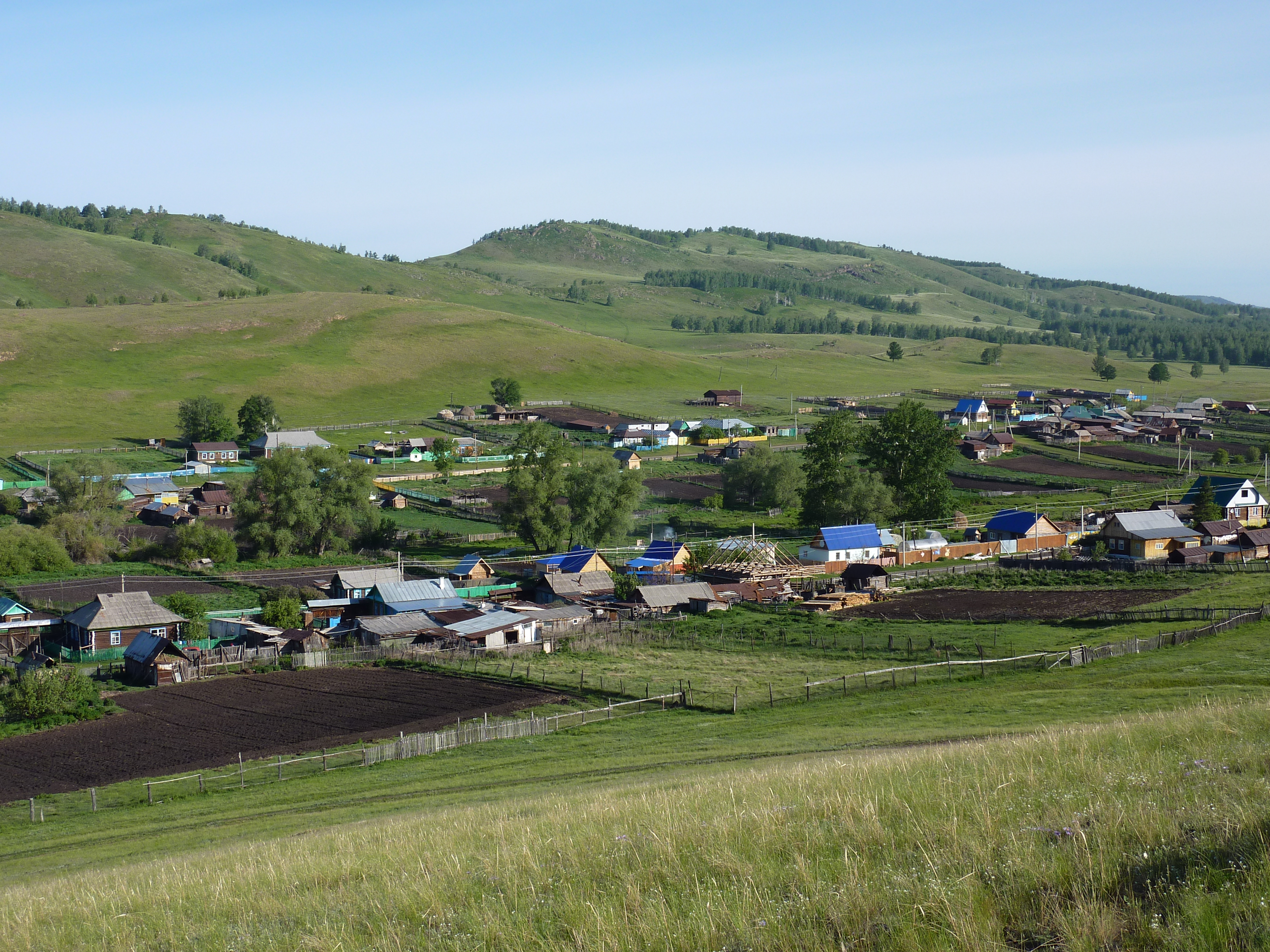

- Location within Bashkortostan Location within Russia
- Coordinates: 53°15′N 58°26′E
- Country: Russia
- Region: Bashkortostan
- District: Abzelilovsky District
- Time zone: UTC+5:00

Yarlykapovo (Russian: Ярлыкапово; Bashkir: Ярлыҡап, Yarlıqap) is a rural locality (a village) in Askarovsky Selsoviet, Abzelilovsky District, Bashkortostan, Russia. The population was 54 as of 2010. There are 2 streets.

== Geography ==
Yarlykapovo is located 12 km southwest of Askarovo (the district's administrative centre) by road. Tal-Kuskarovo is the nearest rural locality.
