= Kalmakovo =

Kalmakovo Калмаково
- Village
- Location within Bashkortostan Location within Russia
- Coordinates: 53°09′N 58°27′E
- Country: Russia
- Region: Bashkortostan
- District: Abzelilovsky District
- Time zone: UTC+5:00

Kalmakovo (Russian: Калмаково; Bashkir: Ҡалмаҡ, Qalmaq) is a rural locality (a village) in Khalilovsky Selsoviet, Abzelilovsky District, Bashkortostan, Russia. The population was 22 as of 2010. There is 1 street.

== Geography ==
Kalmakovo is located 31 km south of Askarovo (the district's administrative centre) by road. Ishkulovo is the nearest rural locality.
