= Tal-Kuskarovo =

Tal-Kuskarovo Тал-Кускарово
- Village
- Location within Bashkortostan Location within Russia
- Coordinates: 53°14′N 58°27′E
- Country: Russia
- Region: Bashkortostan
- District: Abzelilovsky District
- Time zone: UTC+5:00

Tal-Kuskarovo (Russian: Тал-Кускарово; Bashkir: Тал Ҡусҡары, Tal Qusqarı) is a rural locality (a village) in Gusevsky Selsoviet, Abzelilovsky District, Bashkortostan, Russia. The population was 464 as of 2010. There are 9 streets.

== Geography ==
Tal-Kuskarovo is located 15 km southwest of Askarovo (the district's administrative centre) by road. Yarlykapovo is the nearest rural locality.
