= Dautovo =

Dautovo Даутово
- Village
- Location within Bashkortostan Location within Russia
- Coordinates: 53°22′N 58°31′E
- Country: Russia
- Region: Bashkortostan
- District: Abzelilovsky District
- Time zone: UTC+5:00

Dautovo (Russian: Даутово; Bashkir: Дауыт, Dawıt) is a rural locality (a village) in Askarovsky Selsoviet, Abzelilovsky District, Bashkortostan, Russia. The population was 352 as of 2010. There are 17 streets.

== Geography ==
Dautovo is located 4 km north of Askarovo (the district's administrative centre) by road. Askarovo is the nearest rural locality.
