= Zelyonaya Polyana =

Zelyonaya Polyana Зелёная Поляна Bashkir: Зелёная Поляна
- Village
- Location within Bashkortostan Location within Russia
- Coordinates: 53°36′N 58°37′E
- Country: Russia
- Region: Bashkortostan
- District: Abzelilovsky District
- Time zone: UTC+5:00

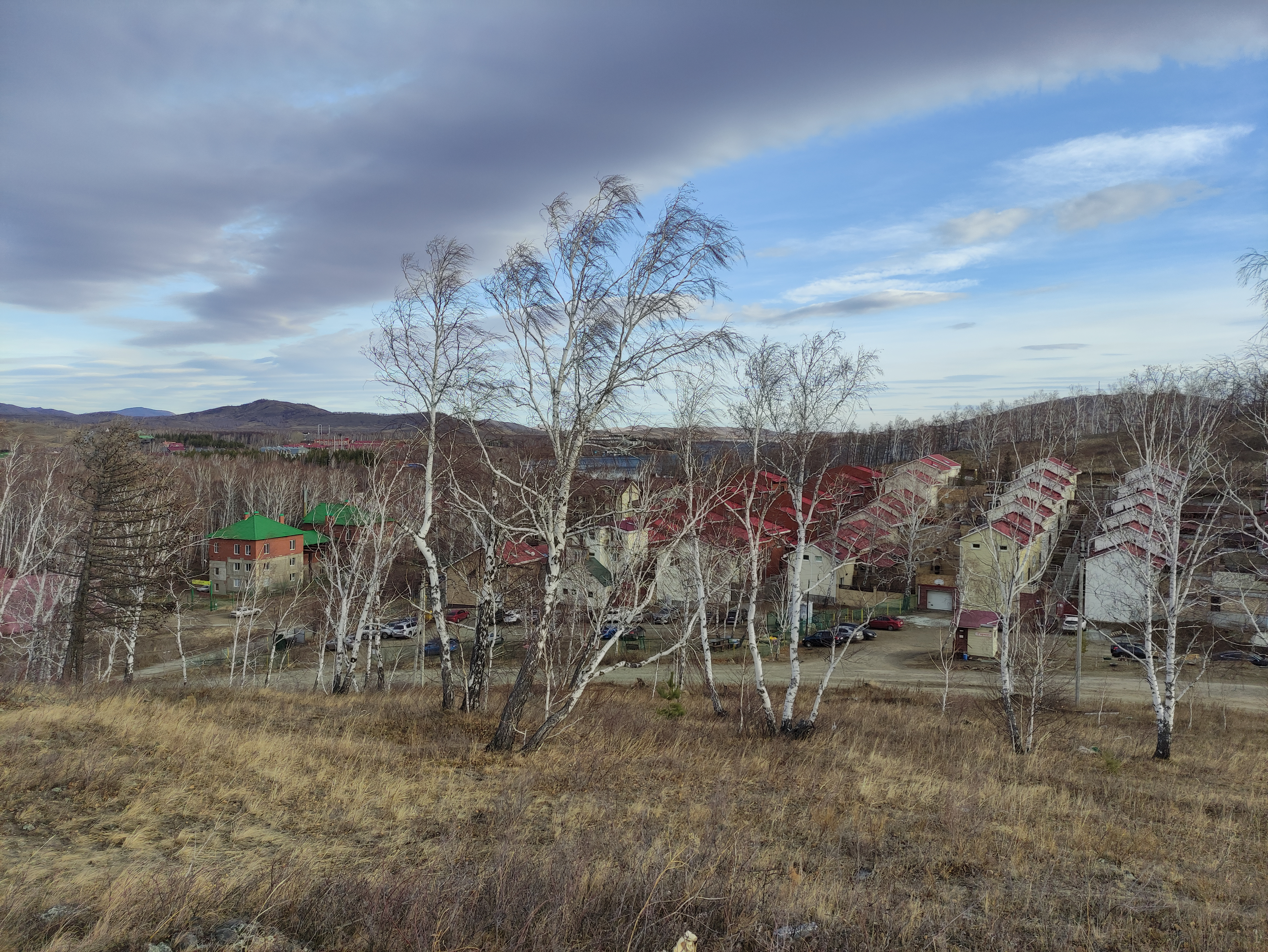
Village of Zelenaya Polyana from Kurortnaya street

Zelyonaya Polyana (Russian: Зелёная Поляна, Bashkir: Зелёная Поляна) is a rural locality (a village) in Tashbulatovsky Selsoviet, Abzelilovsky District, Bashkortostan, Russia. The population was 136 as of 2010. There are 25 streets.

== Geography ==
Zelyonaya Polyana is located 42 km north of Askarovo (the district's administrative centre) by road. Kusimovskogo rudnika is the nearest rural locality.
