= Salavat-sovkhoz =

Salavat-sovkhoz Салават-совхоз
- Khutor
- Location within Bashkortostan Location within Russia
- Coordinates: 53°35′N 58°27′E
- Country: Russia
- Region: Bashkortostan
- District: Abzelilovsky District
- Time zone: UTC+5:00

Salavat-sovkhoz (Russian: Салават-совхоз; Bashkir: Салауат совхозы, Salawat sovxozı) is a rural locality (a khutor) in Burangulovsky Selsoviet, Abzelilovsky District, Bashkortostan, Russia. The population was 1 as of 2010. There is 1 street.

== Geography ==
Salavat-sovkhoz is located 85 km north of Askarovo (the district's administrative centre) by road. Mukhametovo is the nearest rural locality.
