= Derevnya Samarskogo otdeleniya sovkhoza =

Derevnya Samarskogo otdeleniya sovkhoza Деревня Самарского отделения совхоза
- Village
- Location within Bashkortostan Location within Russia
- Coordinates: 53°30′N 58°49′E
- Country: Russia
- Region: Bashkortostan
- District: Abzelilovsky District
- Time zone: UTC+5:00

Derevnya Samarskogo otdeleniya sovkhoza (Russian: Деревня Самарского отделения совхоза; Bashkir: Совхоздың Һамар бүлексәһе, Sovxozdıñ Hamar büleksähe) is a rural locality (a village) in Krasnobashkirsky Selsoviet, Abzelilovsky District, Bashkortostan, Russia. The population was 510 as of 2010. There are 6 streets.

== Geography ==
The village is located 40 km northeast of Askarovo (the district's administrative centre) by road. Ozyornoye is the nearest rural locality.
