= Aygyrbatkan =

Aygyrbatkan Айгырбаткан
- Khutor
- Location within Bashkortostan Location within Russia
- Coordinates: 53°17′N 58°31′E
- Country: Russia
- Region: Bashkortostan
- District: Abzelilovsky District
- Time zone: UTC+5:00

Aygyrbatkan (Russian: Айгырбаткан; Bashkir: Айғырбатҡан, Ayğırbatqan) is a rural locality (a khutor) in Askarovsky Selsoviet, Abzelilovsky District, Bashkortostan, Russia. The population was 30 as of 2010. There are 2 streets.

== Geography ==
Aygyrbatkan is located 7 km south of Askarovo (the district's administrative centre) by road. Askarovo is the nearest rural locality.
