= Verkhneye Abdryashevo =

Verkhneye Abdryashevo Верхнее Абдряшево
- Village
- Location within Bashkortostan Location within Russia
- Coordinates: 52°57′N 58°45′E
- Country: Russia
- Region: Bashkortostan
- District: Abzelilovsky District
- Time zone: UTC+5:00

Verkhneye Abdryashevo (Russian: Верхнее Абдряшево; Bashkir: Үрге Әбдрәш, Ürge Äbdräş) is a rural locality (a village) in Almukhametovsky Selsoviet, Abzelilovsky District, Bashkortostan, Russia. The population was 458 as of 2010. There are 6 streets.

== Geography ==
Verkhneye Abdryashevo is located 62 km south of Askarovo (the district's administrative centre) by road. Almukhametovo is the nearest rural locality.
