= Aumyshevo =

Aumyshevo Аумышево Әүмеш
- Village
- Location within Bashkortostan Location within Russia
- Coordinates: 53°32′N 58°41′E
- Country: Russia
- Region: Bashkortostan
- District: Abzelilovsky District
- Time zone: UTC+5:00

Aumyshevo (Russian: Аумышево; Bashkir: Әүмеш, Äwmeş) is a rural locality (a village) in Tashtimerovsky Selsoviet, Abzelilovsky District, Bashkortostan, Russia. The population was 107 as of 2010. There are 4 streets.

== Geography ==
Aumyshevo is located 35 km north of Askarovo (the district's administrative centre) by road. Samarskoye is the nearest rural locality.
