= Yangi-Aul =

Yangi-Aul Янги-Аул
- Village
- Location within Bashkortostan Location within Russia
- Coordinates: 53°19′N 58°40′E
- Country: Russia
- Region: Bashkortostan
- District: Abzelilovsky District
- Time zone: UTC+5:00

Yangi-Aul (Russian: Янги-Аул; Bashkir: Яңауыл, Yañawıl) is a rural locality (a village) in Davletovsky Selsoviet, Abzelilovsky District, Bashkortostan, Russia. The population was 311 as of 2010. There are 3 streets.

== Geography ==
Yangi-Aul is located 15 km east of Askarovo (the district's administrative centre) by road. Davletovo is the nearest rural locality.
