= Kuzhanovo =

Kuzhanovo Кужаново
- Village
- Location within Bashkortostan Location within Russia
- Coordinates: 53°21′N 58°33′E
- Country: Russia
- Region: Bashkortostan
- District: Abzelilovsky District
- Time zone: UTC+5:00

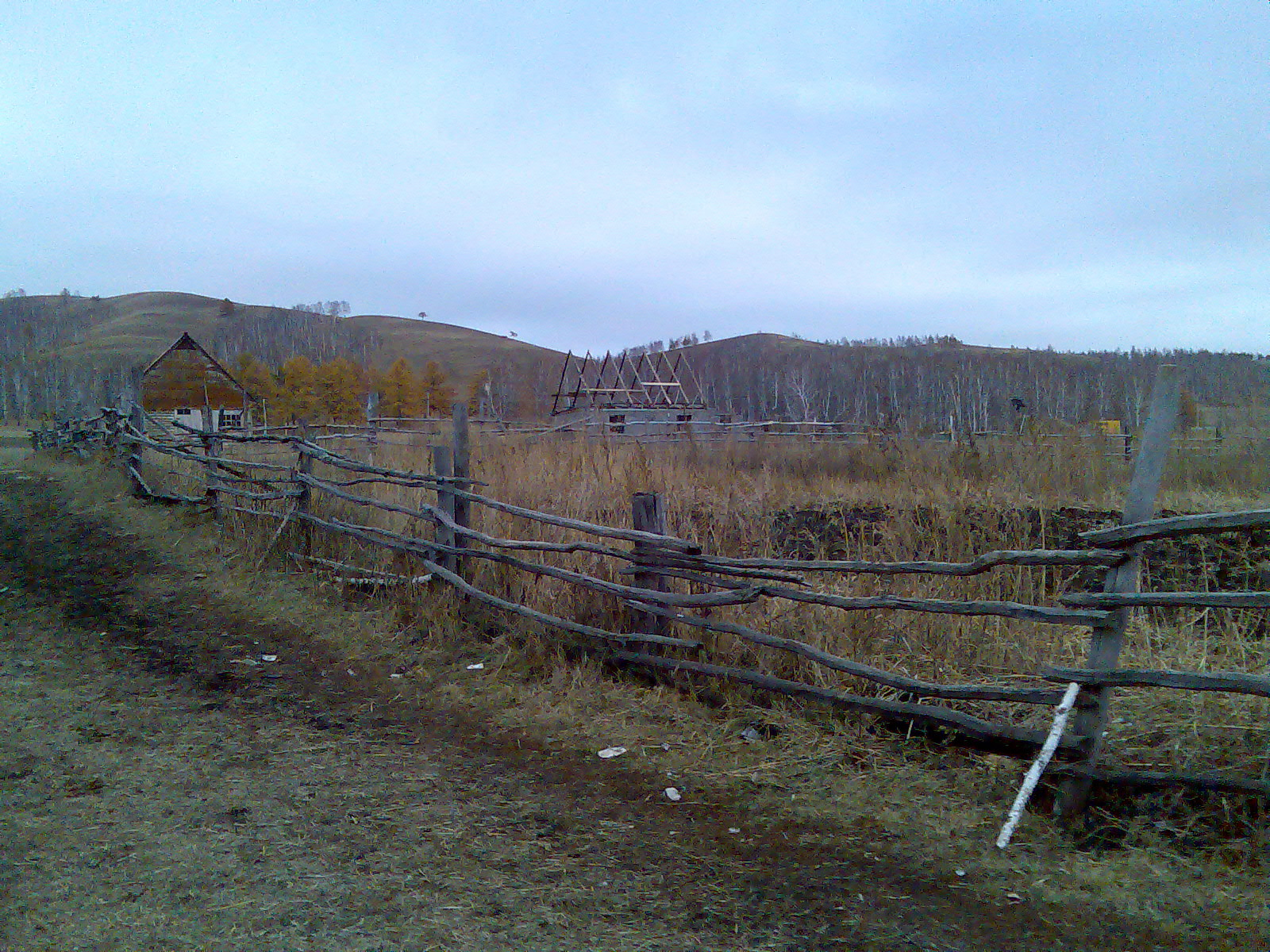
Abzelilovsky District, Kuzhanovo

Kuzhanovo (Russian: Кужаново; Bashkir: Ҡужан, Qujan) is a rural locality (a village) in Tashtimerovsky Selsoviet, Abzelilovsky District, Bashkortostan, Russia. The population was 256 as of 2010. There are 4 streets.

== Geography ==
Kuzhanovo is located 14 km north of Askarovo (the district's administrative centre) by road. Salavatovo is the nearest rural locality.
