= Ulyandy =

Ulyandy Улянды
- Village
- Location within Bashkortostan Location within Russia
- Coordinates: 53°38′N 58°48′E
- Country: Russia
- Region: Bashkortostan
- District: Abzelilovsky District
- Time zone: UTC+5:00

Ulyandy (Russian: Улянды; Bashkir: Үләнде, Ülände) is a rural locality (a village) in Tashbulatovsky Selsoviet, Abzelilovsky District, Bashkortostan, Russia. The population was 82 as of 2010. There is 1 street.

== Geography ==
Ulyandy is located 55 km northeast of Askarovo (the district's administrative centre) by road. Tashbulatovo is the nearest rural locality.
