= Yelimbetovo =

Yelimbetovo Елимбетово
- Village
- Location within Bashkortostan Location within Russia
- Coordinates: 53°30′N 58°39′E
- Country: Russia
- Region: Bashkortostan
- District: Abzelilovsky District
- Time zone: UTC+5:00

Yelimbetovo (Russian: Елимбетово; Bashkir: Йәлембәт, Yälembät) is a rural locality (a village) in Tashtimerovsky Selsoviet, Abzelilovsky District, Bashkortostan, Russia. The population was 371 as of 2010. There are 5 streets.

== Geography ==
Yelimbetovo is located 26 km northeast of Askarovo (the district's administrative centre) by road. Tashtimerovo is the nearest rural locality.
