= Burangulovo =

Burangulovo Бурангулово
- Selo
- Location within Bashkortostan Location within Russia
- Coordinates: 53°28′N 58°40′E
- Country: Russia
- Region: Bashkortostan
- District: Abzelilovsky District
- Time zone: UTC+5:00

Burangulovo (Russian: Бурангулово; Bashkir: Буранғол, Buranğol) is a rural locality (a selo) and the administrative center of Burangulovsky Selsoviet, Abzelilovsky District, Bashkortostan, Russia. The population was 773 as of 2010. There are 8 streets.

== Geography ==
Burangulovo is located 40 km northwest of Askarovo (the district's administrative centre) by road. Iskakovo is the nearest rural locality.
