= Ayusazovo =

Ayusazovo Аюсазово Айыуһаҙ
- Village
- Location within Bashkortostan Location within Russia
- Coordinates: 53°35′N 58°42′E
- Country: Russia
- Region: Bashkortostan
- District: Abzelilovsky District
- Time zone: UTC+5:00

Ayusazovo (Russian: Аюсазово; Bashkir: Айыуһаҙ, Ayıwhaź) is a rural locality (a village) in Tashbulatovsky Selsoviet, Abzelilovsky District, Bashkortostan, Russia. The population was 205 as of 2010. There are 6 streets.

== Geography ==
Ayusazovo is located 52 km northeast of Askarovo (the district's administrative centre) by road. Tashbulatovo is the nearest rural locality.
