= Gusevo, Bashkortostan =

Gusevo Гусево
- Selo
- Location within Bashkortostan Location within Russia
- Coordinates: 53°16′N 58°44′E
- Country: Russia
- Region: Bashkortostan
- District: Abzelilovsky District
- Time zone: UTC+5:00

Gusevo (Russian: Гусево) is a rural locality (a selo) and the administrative center of Gusevsky Selsoviet, Abzelilovsky District, Bashkortostan, Russia. The population was 1,102 as of 2010. There are 7 streets.

== Geography ==
Gusevo is located 22 km southeast of Askarovo (the district's administrative centre) by road. Avnyash is the nearest rural locality.
