= Maygashta =

Maygashta Майгашта
- Khutor
- Location within Bashkortostan Location within Russia
- Coordinates: 53°32′N 58°12′E
- Country: Russia
- Region: Bashkortostan
- District: Abzelilovsky District
- Time zone: UTC+5:00

Maygashta (Russian: Майгашта; Bashkir: Мәйгәште, Mäygäşte) is a rural locality (a khutor) in Burangulovsky Selsoviet, Abzelilovsky District, Bashkortostan, Russia. The population was 234 as of 2010. There are 7 streets.

== Geography ==
Maygashta is located 52 km northwest of Askarovo (the district's administrative centre) by road. Sharipovo is the nearest rural locality.
