= Selivanovsky =

Selivanovsky (masculine), Selivanovskaya (feminine), or Selivanovskoye (neuter) may refer to:

- Selivanovsky District, a district of Vladimir Oblast, Russia
- Selivanovsky (inhabited locality) (Selivanovskaya, Selivanovskoye), name of several rural localities in Russia
