= Selivanovsky (inhabited locality) =

Selivanovsky (Russian: Селивановский; masculine), Selivanovskaya (Селивановская; feminine), or Selivanovskoye (Селивановское; neuter) is the name of several rural localities in Russia:

- Selivanovsky (rural locality), a village in Davletovsky Selsoviet of Abzelilovsky District of the Republic of Bashkortostan
- Selivanovskaya, Lensky District, Arkhangelsk Oblast, a village in Ryabovsky Selsoviet of Lensky District of Arkhangelsk Oblast
- Selivanovskaya, Verkhnetoyemsky District, Arkhangelsk Oblast, a village in Fedkovsky Selsoviet of Verkhnetoyemsky District of Arkhangelsk Oblast
- Selivanovskaya, Vinogradovsky District, Arkhangelsk Oblast, a village in Konetsgorsky Selsoviet of Vinogradovsky District of Arkhangelsk Oblast
- Selivanovskaya, Rostov Oblast, a stanitsa in Selivanovskoye Rural Settlement of Milyutinsky District of Rostov Oblast
