= Selivanovsky (rural locality) =

Selivanovsky Селивановский
- Village
- Location within Bashkortostan Location within Russia
- Coordinates: 53°23′N 58°41′E
- Country: Russia
- Region: Bashkortostan
- District: Abzelilovsky District
- Time zone: UTC+5:00

Selivanovsky (Russian: Селивановский) is a rural locality (a village) in Davletovsky Selsoviet, Abzelilovsky District, Bashkortostan, Russia. The population was 188 as of 2010. There are 9 streets.

== Geography ==
Selivanovsky is located 18 km northeast of Askarovo (the district's administrative centre) by road. Davletovo is the nearest rural locality.
