= Askarovo, Abzelilovsky District, Republic of Bashkortostan =

Rural locality in the Republic of Bashkortostan, Russia

Askarovo Аскарово
- Selo

Other transcription(s)
  - Bashkir: Асҡар
- Interactive map of Askarovo
- Location of Askarovo Askarovo (Bashkortostan)
- Coordinates: 53°20′16″N 58°30′31″E
- Country: Russia
- Federal subject: Bashkortostan
- Administrative district: Abzelilovsky District
- SelsovietSelsoviet: Askarovsky

Population (2010 Census)
  - Total: 7,634
  - Estimate (2010): 7,634 (0%)

Administrative status
  - Capital of: Abzelilovsky District, Askarovsky Selsoviet

Municipal status
  - Municipal district: Abzelilovsky Municipal District
  - Rural settlement: Askarovsky Selsoviet Rural Settlement
  - Capital of: Abzelilovsky Municipal District, Askarovsky Selsoviet Rural Settlement
- Time zone: UTC+5 (MSK+2)
- Postal code: 453620
- OKTMO ID: 80601410101

Askarovo (Russian: Аскарово, Bashkir: Асҡар, Asqar) is a rural locality (a selo) and the administrative center of Abzelilovsky District of the Republic of Bashkortostan, Russia. Population: 7,634 (2010 census); 7,067 (2002 census); 5,251 (1989 Soviet census).
