= Abzelilovsky District =

Districts in Bashkortostan, Russia

Abzelilovsky District Абзелиловский район (Russian)
- District

Other transcription(s)
  - Bashkir: Әбйәлил районы
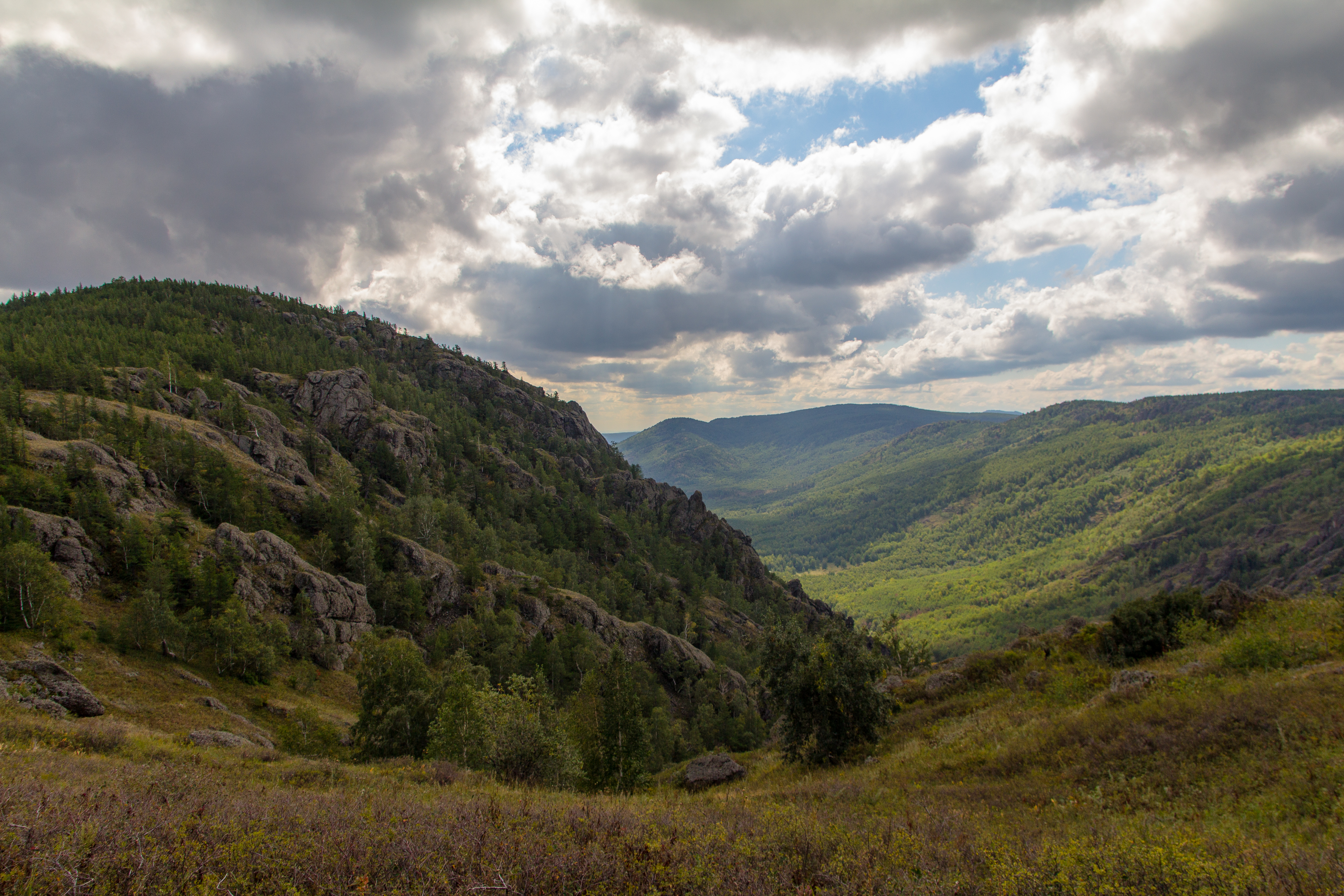
- Kryktytau Mountain Range in Abzelilovsky District

- Flag Coat of arms
- Location of Abzelilovsky District in the Republic of Bashkortostan
- Coordinates: 53°N 59°E
- Country: Russia
- Federal subject: Republic of Bashkortostan
- Established: 1930
- Administrative center: Askarovo

Area
  - Total: 4,288 km^{2} (1,656 sq mi)

Population
  - Estimate (2021): 45,300

Administrative structure
  - Administrative divisions: 15 Selsoviets
  - Inhabited localities: 91 rural localities

Municipal structure
  - Municipally incorporated as: Abzelilovsky Municipal District
  - Municipal divisions: 0 urban settlements, 15 rural settlements
- Time zone: UTC+5 (MSK+2)
- OKTMO ID: 80601000
- Website: http://www.abyalil.ru/

Abzelilovsky District (Russian: Абзели́ловский райо́н; Bashkir: Әбйәлил районы, Äbyälil rayonı) is an administrative and municipal district (raion), one of the fifty-four in the Republic of Bashkortostan, Russia. It is located in the southeast of the republic, bordered by Chelyabinsk Oblast to the east. The area of the district is 4,288 square kilometers (1,656 sq mi). Its administrative center is the rural locality (a selo) of Askarovo. As of the 2021 Russian census, Abzelilovsky District has a population of 45,300.

== Geography ==
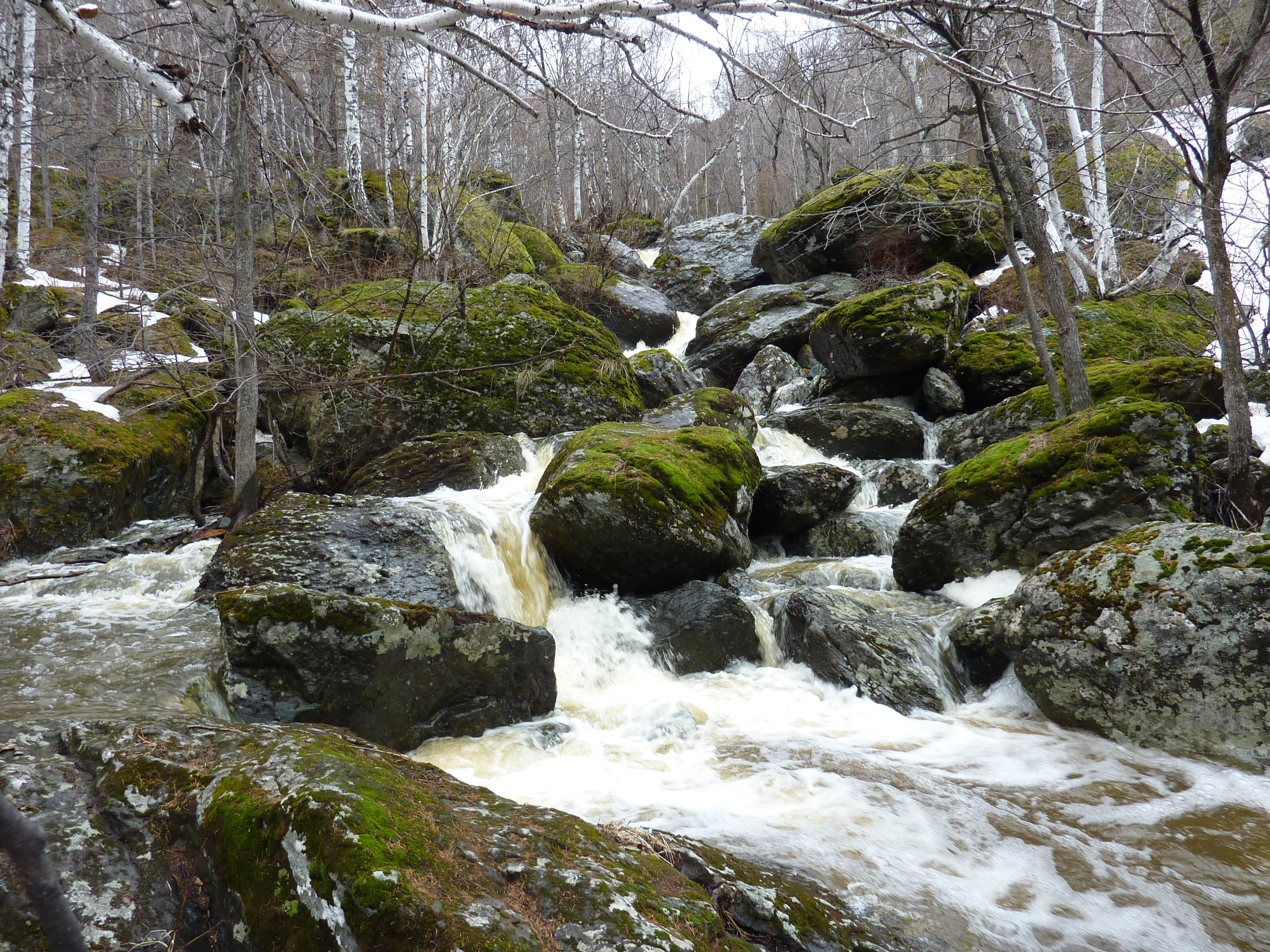
Mogak Waterfall in Abzelilovsky District

Abzelilovsky District borders Uchalinsky District to the northeast, Beloretsky District to the northwest, Burzyansky District to the west, Baymaksky District to the south, and Chelyabinsk Oblast to the east.

About a quarter of the district's territory is covered by forests, and there are thirty-three lakes and many rivers. The district is rich in minerals, including copper, marble, jasper, and limestone.

== History ==
The district was established in 1930.

== Administrative and municipal status ==
Within the framework of administrative divisions, Abzelilovsky District is one of the fifty-four in the Republic of Bashkortostan. The district is divided into fifteen selsoviets, comprising ninety-one rural localities. As a municipal division, the district is incorporated as Abzelilovsky Municipal District. Its fifteen selsoviets are incorporated as fifteen rural settlements within the municipal district. The selo of Askarovo serves as the administrative center of both the administrative and municipal district.

== Demographics ==
Population of Abzelilovsky District
- 2010 Census: 45,551
- 2002 Census: 43,262
- 1989 Census: 39,524
- 1979 Census: 38,463

As of the 2021 Russian census, Abzelilovsky District has a population of 45,300. 22,097 people (48.78% of the total population) identified as male, while 23,203 (51.22%) identified as female. 100% of the population was classified as living in rural areas.

As of the 2010 census, the total population of the district was 45,551, with the population of Askarovo accounting for 16.8% of that number.

2021 Russian census ethnicity data
Ethnic group	Population	Percentage
Bashkir	41,209	90.97%
Russian	3,115	6.88%
Tatar	479	1.06%
Kazakh	79	0.17%
Others	279	0.62%
Refused to identify	139	0.31%
