= Ivan Babanov =

Soviet pilot

- Native name: Иван Дмитриевич Бабанов
- Born: 17 January [O.S. 4 January] 1911; Ivanovo-Voznesensk, Shuysky Uyezd, Vladimir Governorate, Russian Empire
- Died: 4 January 1972 (aged 60) Ivanovo, Russian SFSR, Soviet Union
- Allegiance: Soviet Union
- Branch: Soviet Naval Aviation
- Service years: 1941–1946
- Rank: Guard Senior Lieutenant
- Conflicts: Second World War
- Awards: Hero of the Soviet Union

Ivan Dmitriyevich Babanov (Russian: Иван Дмитриевич Бабанов; 17 January [O.S. 4 January] 1911 — 4 January 1972) was a bomber pilot of the Soviet Naval Aviation during the Second World War. He was awarded the title of Hero of the Soviet Union on 5 November 1944, having been promoted to the rank of guard senior lieutenant on 1 November 1944.

== Biography ==
Babanov was born in a working-class family on 17 January [O.S. 4 January] 1911 in the city of Ivanovo-Voznesensk (now Ivanovo). Russian. He graduated from an incomplete secondary school, the Ivanovo Soviet Party School.

Between 1933 and 1935 Babanov served in the Red Army. In 1934, Ivan Babanov graduated from the Joint Military School named after the All-Russian Central Executive Committee (now the Moscow Higher Military Command School). For about a year he served as a platoon commander of the Joint Military School of the Red Army named after the All-Russian Central Executive Committee. After that, he worked in the NKVD system of the USSR, then as a foreman for the repair of looms at the Ivanovo melange plant. He was a member of the CPSU (b) since 1932.

With the beginning of the Axis invasion of the Soviet Union in the summer of 1941, he was again called up for military service and sent to the Red Fleet, to the naval aviation branch. He graduated from the courses of gunners-bombers of naval aviation, and served in the 1st and 3rd reserve aviation regiments.

At the front since August 1943, he fought as part of the 1st Guards Mine-Torpedo Aviation Regiment of the Baltic Fleet Air Force. He flew on the U-2, R-5, SB, DB-4, A-20 "Boston" aircraft. He made his first sorties to lay minefields, and opened a combat account on the night of 27 April 1944, sinking a German tanker.

The navigator of the 1st Guards Mine-Torpedo Aviation Regiment (8th Mine-Torpedo Aviation Division, Baltic Fleet Air Force) Guard Lieutenant Babanov made 68 sorties by September 1944, participated in the sinking of 6 transports, a tanker and an enemy patrol ship . He always accurately led the torpedo bomber to the target and accurately dropped torpedoes. On 13 August, in two sorties, the crew of pilot Mikhail Shishkov and navigator Babanov sank first a patrol ship, and then a large transport. Soon, in one of the sorties, an anti-aircraft shell exploded in Babanov's navigational cockpit. The pilot was able to land the damaged aircraft at a nearby airfield. In the hospital, he counted 16 wounds. There, in the hospital, he learned about the high award.

By decree of the Presidium of the Supreme Soviet of the Soviet Union of 5 November 1944, for the exemplary performance of combat missions of the command on the front of the fight against the German invaders and the courage and heroism shown by the guards, Lieutenant Babanov Ivan Dmitrievich was awarded the title of Hero of the Soviet Union with the award of the Order of Lenin and the Gold Star medal (No. 4335). By the same decree, the title of Hero was also awarded to M.F. Shishkov.

Since November 1944, he again served in his “native” regiment as head of the mine and torpedo service, but was not allowed to take part in combat missions for health reasons. Since January 1946, he was a squadron adjutant in the 14th Guards Fighter Aviation Regiment of the KBF Air Force. In July 1946, Senior Lieutenant I. D. Babanov was transferred to the reserve.

He returned to his hometown. He worked as an assistant foreman at a melange plant in Ivanovo. He died on 4 January 1972. He was buried at the Balino Cemetery in the city of Ivanovo.

== Awards ==
- Hero of the Soviet Union (5 November 1944)
- Order of Lenin (5 November 1944)
- Three Orders of the Red Banner (20 May 1944, 18 July 1944, 13 October 1944)
- A number of medals of the USSR

== Memorial ==
- г. Иваново, кладбище Балино, памятник на могиле

== Literature ==
- Heroes of the Soviet Union: A Brief Biographical Dictionary / Prev. ed. Collegium I. N. Shkadov. - M .: Military Publishing, 1987. - T. 1 / Abaev - Lyubichev /. — 911 p. — 100,000 copies. — ISBN ots., Reg. No. in RCP 87–95382.
- Heroes of war. - Tallinn, 1984
- Heroes of fiery years. Essays on Muscovites - Heroes of the Soviet Union. Issue. 5. - M .: Moskovsky worker, 1982.
- Burov A. V. Your heroes, Leningrad. - L .: Lenizdat, 1970.
- Levshov P. V., Boltenkov D. E. Century in the ranks of the Navy: Aviation of the Russian Navy (1910-2010). Directory. - St. Petersburg: Special issue of the almanac "Typhoon", 2012. - 768 p.
- Morozov M.E. Naval torpedo-carrying aviation. Volume 1 and Volume 2. - St. Petersburg: Galea Print, 2006–2007. - ISBN 978-5-8172-0117-8.
- Feat. 3rd edition, rev. and additional - Yaroslavl, 1980.
