= History of Ivanovo =

Russian city from 1608 onwards

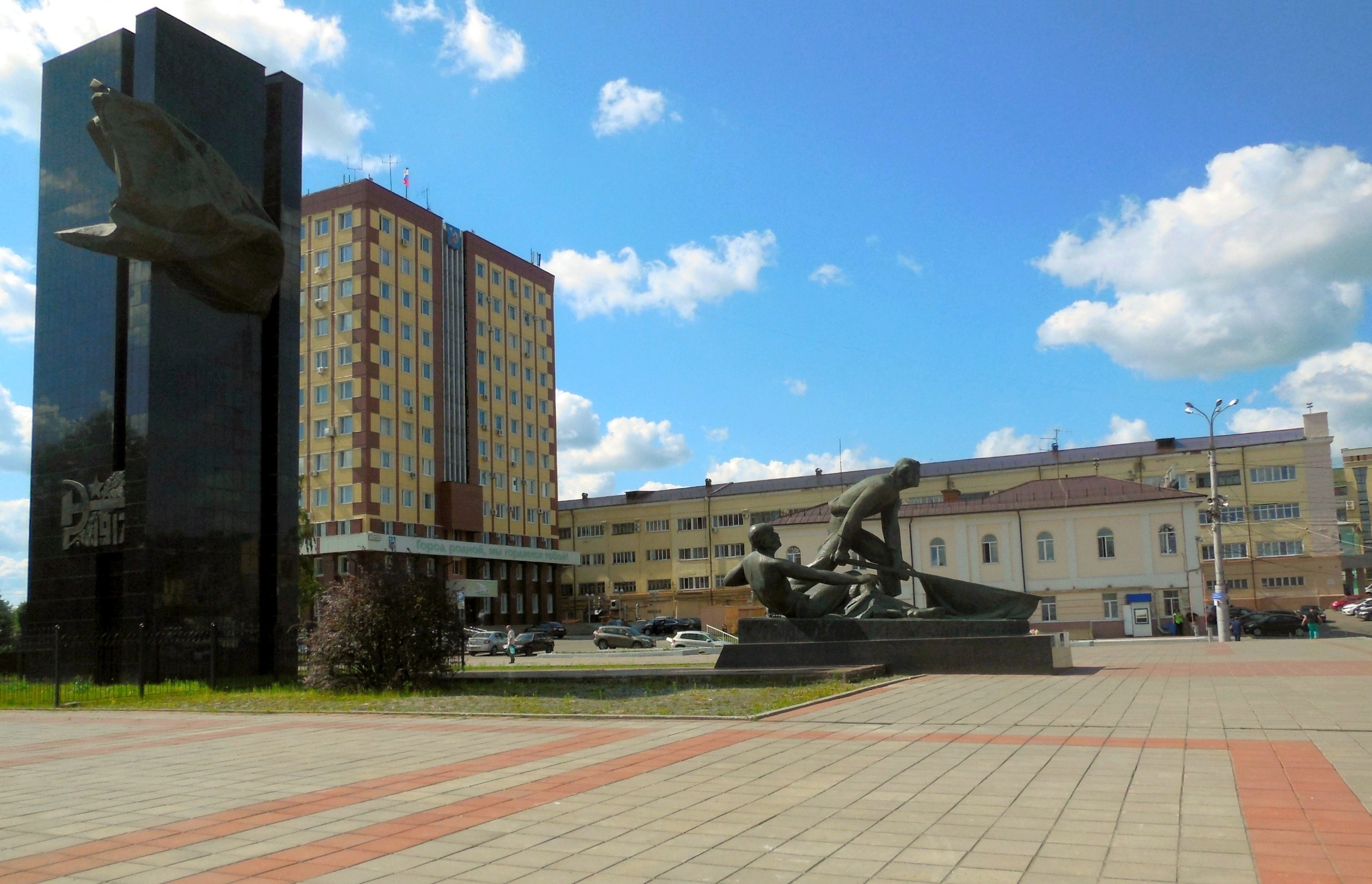
Revolution Square — the main and oldest square in Ivanovo

The history of the Russian city of Ivanovo, the administrative center of Ivanovo Oblast, that spans several centuries. The first known written mention of Ivanovo dates to 1608. Shortly thereafter, the village was captured by Polish invaders, resulting in significant devastation. Due to the region's climate and poor soils, agriculture was unprofitable, leading to the development of textile crafts and trade. This was facilitated by the abundance of streams and rivers necessary for washing fabrics, as well as proximity to trade routes and affordable raw materials. By the end of the 17th century, Ivanovo had become a major craft center, with the population primarily engaged in producing linen canvas, as far as it is dyeing and printing. In the mid-18th century, "capitalist peasants" established the first manufactories, initially for weaving and later for printing, followed by the production of calico. The Fire of Moscow in 1812 destroyed many of Ivanovo's textile competitors, significantly boosting the village's industrial growth. Related industries emerged, including chemical, mechanical, metalworking, and specialized textile equipment production.

In 1871, the merger of Ivanovo village with the Voznesensky Posad, established in 1853, formed the city of Ivanovo-Voznesensk, which became a leading textile center in Russia. Ivanovo-Voznesensk saw a strong revolutionary movement that played a key role in the First Russian Revolution, during which the first citywide Soviet in Russia was established. In 1918, the city became the center of Ivanovo-Voznesensk Governorate. During the 1920s and early 1930s, Ivanovo experienced a period of prosperity and became a hub of modernist art. In 1932, it was renamed Ivanovo. In the mid-20th century, several machine-building enterprises were established to balance the city's predominantly female workforce. Following the dissolution of the USSR, Ivanovo's industry stagnated due to severed economic ties with Central Asian republics supplying cotton, reliance on toll manufacturing, and the shortsightedness of new enterprise managers. Today, only a few small-scale, outdated production facilities remain. However, the sewing industry and wholesale-retail textile trade have achieved success.

Until 2010, Ivanovo held the status of a historical settlement. Currently, Ivanovo has over 1,000 streets, lanes, and residential buildings. Their total length exceeds 650 kilometers.

== Early history ==
In 1959, a student named A. Malygin found an hoe made from elk antler from the Mesolithic era, dated to the 8th millennium BC, in Ivanovo near V. Ya. Stepanov Park. It was discovered in eroded sand displaced by a dredger. Artifacts from the Neolithic era include: a drilled stone axe found in Sosnevo; a stone spearhead and ceramics found in V. Ya. Stepanov Park; and flint tools discovered during the construction of a dam on the Talka River. Artifacts linked to the Fatyanovo culture (Bronze Age) include an axe found in Ryliha, and a stone chisel and axe found while digging a garden on Maria Ryabinina Street near the Uvod River.

In the second half of the 1st and early 2nd millennia CE, the northern, central (where modern Ivanovo is located), and western parts of present-day Ivanovo Oblast were inhabited by the Finno-Ugric Merya tribe. The region near the Volga-Klyazma watershed was a contact zone between two Merya groups: the "Kostroma" and "Rostov" groups. In the 9th–13th centuries, these settlements were gradually absorbed by the Vladimir-Suzdal Principality, whose population largely consisted of Orthodox Christians. In the 10th century, archaeologists led by Konstantin Tikhonravov excavated a large kurgan cemetery, likely from the 10th–11th centuries, on the left bank of the Uvod, near modern Baturina Street, locally known as "Byki". Researchers debate whether these kurgans are Meryan or Old Russian, though they contain many Meryan artifacts. According to factory owner and historian Yakov Garelin, kurgans were also found near the current main post office, but they were destroyed during construction.

== Ivanovo's origins ==
Ivanovo emerged near the old road from Rostov to Gorodec, by the stream Kokúy — a right tributary of the Uvod; it was likely originally called Potekusha or Potok. The historical core and long-standing public center of Ivanovo is the modern Revolution Square, where the wooden Exaltation of the Cross Church stood — possibly the oldest religious structure in this village. The streets Stanko, Palekhskaya, Stepanova, 10 August, and Krasnogvardeyskaya (modern names) are considered by various researchers to be the oldest streets of Ivanovo.

The Shuya merchant and historian V. A. Borisov in his 1851 book Description of the City of Shuya and Its Surroundings suggested that the ancestors of Ivanovo's residents were settlers from the territories of Vologda or Arkhangelsk governorates. In support of his hypothesis, he pointed to similarities in mythology and speech patterns. Y. P. Garelin believed that the ancestors of Ivanovo's residents were migrants from Novgorod lands or even from Veliky Novgorod itself — possibly those who relocated to Suzdal lands after the campaigns of Moscow princes against Veliky Novgorod in the 15th and 16th centuries. In the 1880s, he noted an almost complete similarity in the speech patterns of Ivanovo residents and those from Vologda, which was atypical for Vladimir Governorate (which included Ivanovo at the time), and, unlike the Shuya historian, provided a detailed description of this dialect in his book City of Ivanovo-Voznesensk or the Former Village of Ivanovo and Voznesensky Posad.

During archaeological excavations in 2003 in the city center, in Aptechny Lane (at the site of the construction of the Vozdvizhenka shopping center), many artifacts from the 15th–16th centuries were found, with some dated to the 13th–14th centuries. It is known that in the first half of the 16th century, beaver hunting was widespread along the Uvod, and in the second half of the 16th century, some settlements near the village of Ivanovo, including Kuryanovo and Avdotyino, which are now parts of the city, existed and developed. Thus, archaeological findings and historical evidence suggest with a high degree of probability that Ivanovo already existed in the 15th century.

In the genealogy of the Gandurin manufacturers and on one of the old plans of Ivanovo, stored in the Historical and Local History Museum, there is the following entry:

The exact time of the founding of the village of Ivanovo is unknown, but as early as 1328 it is mentioned as the village of Ivan in the spiritual testament of Ivan Danilovich Kalita, made during his departure to pay homage to the khan in the Golden Horde. Under Dmitry Ivanovich Donskoy, it was called the hamlet of Ivan, and under Vasily Vasilyevich the Dark — the village of Ivanovo.

The entry is not sufficiently reliable: in Ivan Kalita's spiritual testament, certain “Ivani villages” are mentioned, of which there were several along the Uvod, and in the vicinity of Shuya, there were 15 villages with similar names. In the 14th century, this area was part of the Suzdal-Nizhny Novgorod Principality, in the 15th century it came under the control of the Moscow princes and became part of the Opolsky stan of the Suzdal District.

It is often stated that the first mention of Ivanovo dates to 1561, as V. A. Borisov claimed that in that year Ivanovo was transferred as a wealthy estate by Ivan the Terrible to the Cherkassky princes after his marriage to Maria Cherkasskaya. The Shuya historian did not specify the historical source for this information, and no documentary confirmation of his version has been found to date. The version of the transfer of the village to the Cherkassky in 1561 is also questionable because the Kokhma volost (which included Ivanovo) was already the patrimony of the Skopin-Shuysky princes, who were not subject to persecution.

The founding of the Pokrovsky Male Monastery and the monastery settlement of Pritykino is attributed to 1579. The monastery was located near the village, on the so-called Pokrovskaya Hill, where the Palace of Arts now stands the Palace of Arts. In the 20th century, Soviet historian P. M. Ekzemplyarsky reconstructed a plan of the village from the 16th century. This reconstruction is criticized for several dubious details: the plan shows bridges over deep ravines, which were unlikely to have been built by the residents of a small settlement, and roads that were likely located differently due to the different placement of bridges.

Borisov proposed two versions of the origin of the village's name. According to legend, there was a chapel (and later a church) of John the Baptist on the main square (Revolution Square). The first version suggests that Ivanovo was named after it. The second version connects the name to the side chapel of John the Theologian at the Exaltation of the Cross Church. Historian P. N. Travkin, agreeing with the first version, believes that the chapel of John the Baptist could have been built on the site of pagan Kupala rituals. However, there is no documentary evidence for either version. The former chairman of the Ivanovo Regional Local History Society and head of the Department of Russian History at IvSU, Professor K. E. Baldin, asserts that the village could have been named after its founder or first resident, who bore the common Russian name Ivan.

== Village during the Time of Troubles ==
The first written mention of Ivanovo dates to 1608th century. It was found in the registry books of the Trinity Lavra of St. Sergius, where Ivanovo appears as the village Yvanovskoye. The record refers to peasants —Danilka Borisov, Mikhalka Grigoryev ("son of Sofronov"), Pravotorkha and Aristka ("Neronov's children"), and Petrushka Afanasyev ("son of Pershin")— who fled from the monastic estates of Shukhobolva, Kinobal, and Kuchek in Suzdal and Yuryev. They were reported to be living "under the protection of Prince Mikhail Vasilyevich Skopin-Shuysky's mother in her village, Yvanovskoye, in Kokhma, and in surrounding villages".

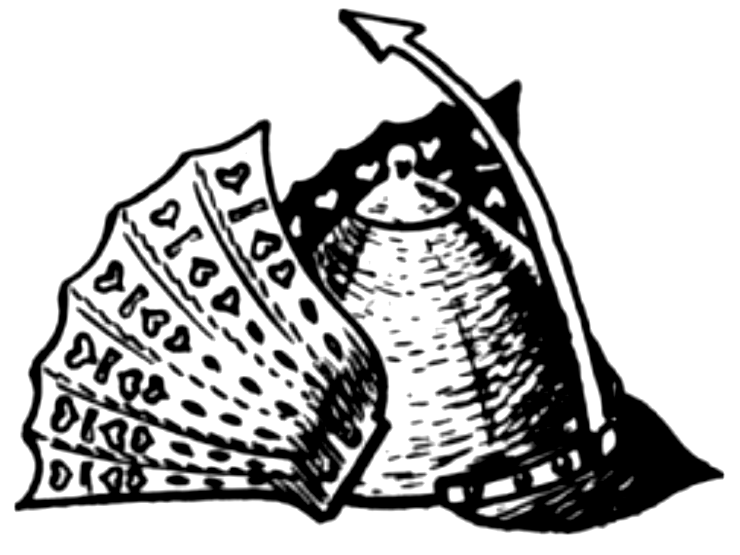
A "winged" Polish helmet found in Ivanovo

During the Time of Troubles, in 1608–1609, Ivanovo was attacked by Polish–Lithuanian forces and their allies from the Tushino camp, including Cossacks. The village served as a base camp for the companies of Pan Martin Sobelsky and Chizhevsky (or Zhichevsky), from which the invaders launched raids on neighboring lands. Another historical mention of Ivanovo from this period appears in a letter dated February 20 (March 2 in the new style) 1609, from the traitorous Suzdal voivode F. K. Pleshcheyev to the Lithuanian hetman Jan Sapieha, which uses the modern form of the village's name:

On the third day, I sent Pan Martin Sobelsky with Cossacks after the thieves, and with him, Pan Chizhevsky from Lisowski’s regiment went with Cossacks. By God’s grace, the tsar’s fortune, and your knightly efforts, they took the city of Plyos on the Volga, defeated the thieves, and after taking Plyos, returned to the old mobile camps in Suzdal district, to the village of Ivanovo and Kokhma. They write to me, my lord, Pan Chizhevsky and Sobelsky with their comrades, urging me to march on Kostroma against the tsar’s traitors; but, my lord, I cannot leave the city unguarded, and it is impossible to march from Suzdal…

The invaders left a significant mark on Ivanovo's history. Local tradition, recorded by Borisov, claims that Ivanovo residents resisted the invaders, fortifying the village with sturdy palisades reinforced with thick planks. The street names Kuren and Panskaya (now parts of Stanko Street), where the invaders' camp was likely located, are often linked to the Cossacks and Poles, respectively. However, words with the root -pan- common in Ivanovo Oblast may derive from ancient names of Meryan kurgan cemeteries rather than the Polish "pans". In 1940, a rare "winged" helmet of a Polish hussar from the late 16th to early 17th century was found in the Uvod River near Pushkin Square. In the 1990s, a rusted and notched Western European sword was discovered during earthworks on Stanko Street.

In the early 17th century and earlier, Ivanovo lacked a fixed name. To distinguish it from other villages with similar names, some documents referred to it as Ivanovo-Kokhomskoye or Ivanovskoye-Kokhomskoye. In 1614 records, it appears as Yvanovo. In a 1619 petition by Ivanovo's owners to Tsar Mikhail Fyodorovich, Ivanovo is called a sel'tso, a term typically denoting a small village without a church. However, Ivanovo was already a village by this time, and the term sel'tso likely reflects its devastated state after the Polish intervention.

Before the Time of Troubles, the Kokhma volost, which included Ivanovo, was a patrimony of the Skopin-Shuysky princes. During the Troubles, it may have been granted by False Dmitry II to his associate Pyotr Bezobrazov. After the collapse of the intervention, Ivanovo's owners became Anna Petrovna (in monasticism Anisya) and Alexandra Vasilyevna (in monasticism Anastasiya), mother and widow of the national liberation hero M. V. Skopin-Shuysky, who were nuns at Suzdal's Pokrovsky Monastery. Skopin-Shuysky is believed to have spent his youth in Kokhma and its surroundings.

== Industrialization's beginning ==
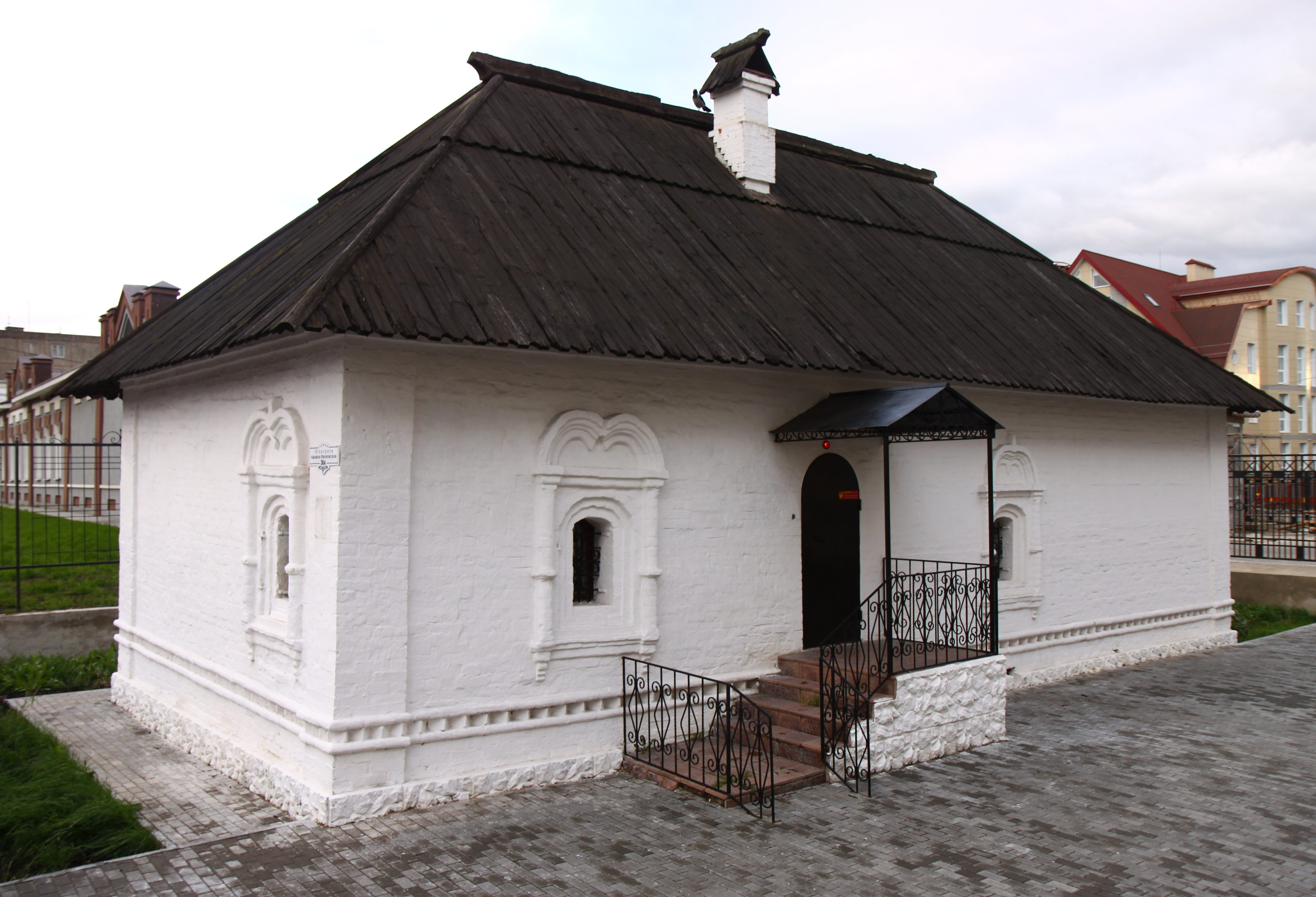
Shchudrov Tent — administrative building, second half of the 17th century

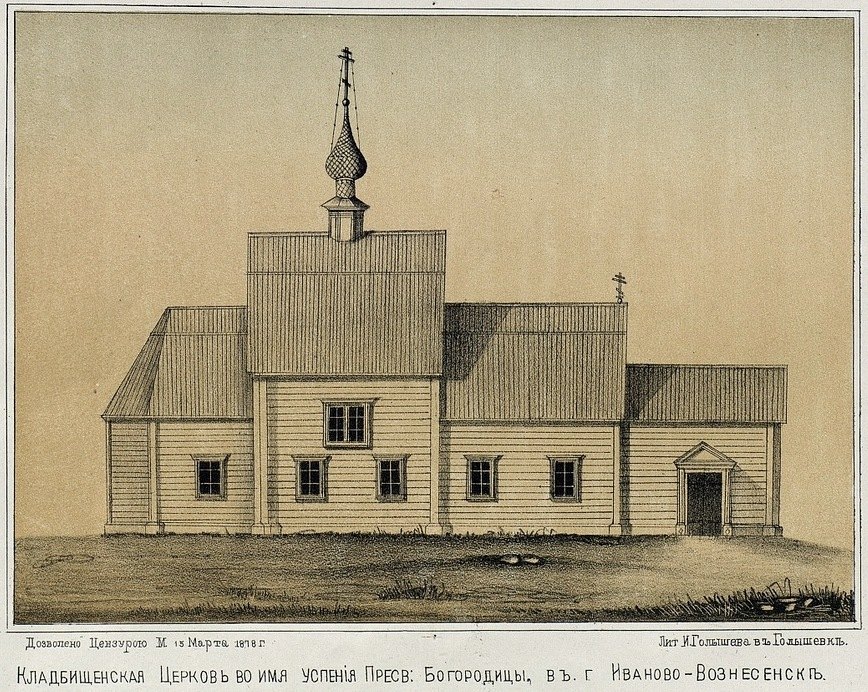
Trinity Church (later Dormition Church), late XVII - early XVIII centuries

In 1631, Ivanovo and its surrounding villages were bequeathed by Anna Petrovna to I. I. Pugovka-Shuysky, the last member of the Shuysky family. In 1638, the village passed to I. B. Cherkassky, and in 1642 to Y. K. Cherkassky. By 1667, it was inherited by Yakov's son, Mikhail Yakovlevich, and later by his grandson, Aleksey Mikhailovich.

According to a census from the early 1630s, when the village was referred to as Ivanovskoye, Ivanovo and its monastic settlement had 123 households, but 34 were vacant due to peasants fleeing famine and banditry following the Time of Troubles. The population was 88 people. For the early 17th century, this was a significant size, as the average village had about 15 households. The census also noted the presence of flour milling in Ivanovo. In the early 1630s, the village had three wooden churches: Krestovozdvizhenskaya (with a chapel dedicated to John the Theologian), Pyatnitskaya on the main square, and a small monastic church.

The population later grew, and by the 1667 census, there were 312 households, with only 38 engaged in agriculture. The village had 818 residents, excluding clergy and administrators. The main square was called Torgovaya (Trading Square). In 1693, a stone Pokrovsky Church was built in the monastery. The wooden Trinity Church of the Pokrovsky Monastery, later renamed Uspensky, dates to the late 17th or early 18th century. The Trinity (Uspensky) Church and the Shchudrov Tent are the earliest surviving structures. A 1699 fire destroyed the Krestovozdvizhenskaya and Pyatnitskaya churches. Soon after, a stone bell tower and a wooden summer Vozdvizhenskaya Church were built in their place. Since the 17th century, Old Belief was prominent in Ivanovo, with most adherents being Bespopovtsy-Fedoseevtsy, and fewer Popovtsy. Old Believers significantly influenced local industry development.

The region's trade and industrial character was shaped by natural and geographical factors: a harsh climate and poor soils made agriculture risky, but navigable rivers and cheap raw materials (hemp, flax, wool, leather, etc.) were abundant. In the 17th century, as southern and eastern regions supplied grain, agriculture became less viable. Peasants abandoned fields for crafts and trade. Ivanovo's location near major roads and waterways (the Uvod River was navigable up to Lezhnevo, possibly to Ivanovo itself; the Teza was key for trade) was advantageous. By the 17th century, Ivanovo excelled in textile crafts, particularly weaving linen fabrics and their finishing.

Fabric finishing techniques varied: dyeing entire cloth by boiling, dyeing individual threads before weaving, or block printing patterns. The latter was the most complex. Block printing, which emerged in Ivanovo in the late 17th century, was aided by numerous streams and rivers essential for washing dyed fabrics. Initially, patterns were printed in one color using a single wooden block, then hand-painted with bright colors. Later, multiple blocks were used for multicolored designs. By the early 18th century, Ivanovo had trade links with Astrakhan, facilitating commerce with the East. Eastern culture, alongside local and European traditions, influenced fabric designs, with the paisley motif becoming common. Recognizing Ivanovo's economic importance, Peter I decreed in 1705 the establishment of a customs house to collect duties.

In 1743, Aleksey Cherkassky's daughter married Count P. B. Sheremetev, and Ivanovo was included in her dowry. In 1775, Ivanovo was incorporated into Shuysky Uyezd of Vladimir Governorate. Later owners included N. P. Sheremetev and D. N. Sheremetev. The Ivanovo estate, stretching south along the Uvod River, was among the Sheremetevs' most profitable properties. In 1761, a stone Church of the Nativity of Christ was built on Torgovaya Square. In 1764, the Pokrovsky Monastery was closed. Fires highlight Ivanovo's size: in 1723, about 200 peasant households burned; in 1775, 400 houses; in 1781, 260 houses; and in 1783, 500 houses. The 1775 fire destroyed the Vozdvizhenskaya Church, and 20 years later, a stone Krestovozdvizhensky Church was built on the site. After the 1775 fire, P. B. Sheremetev ordered the village rebuilt according to a plan.

Textile trade brought significant income to enterprising peasants, establishing ties with cities like Saint Petersburg. By the early 18th century, a wealthy peasant elite, known as "capitalist peasants," emerged. In the mid-18th century, they began investing trade profits into industrial production. Grigory Butrimov founded Ivanovo's first linen-weaving manufactory in 1742. By 1748, its annual fabric output was valued at approximately 11,000 rubles. In 1748, Butrimov's partner I. I. Grachyov started a large enterprise, followed by "factories" by Yamanovsky and Garelin, producing coarse linen and fine napkin cloth.

Late 18th and early 19th centuries calico

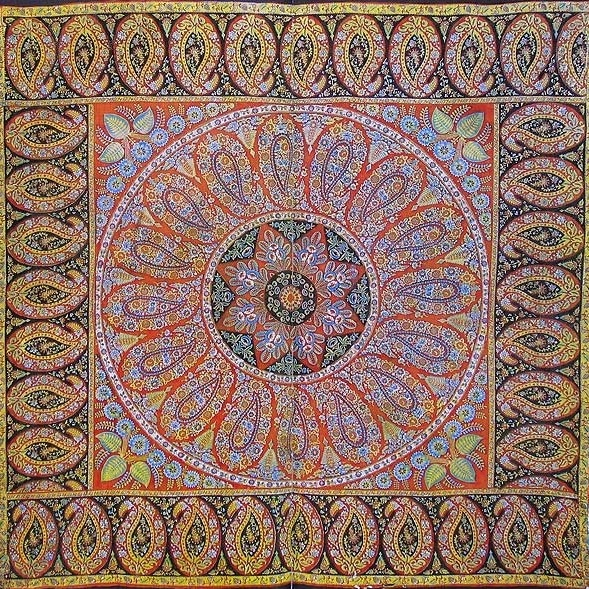
O. S. Skokov's manufactory

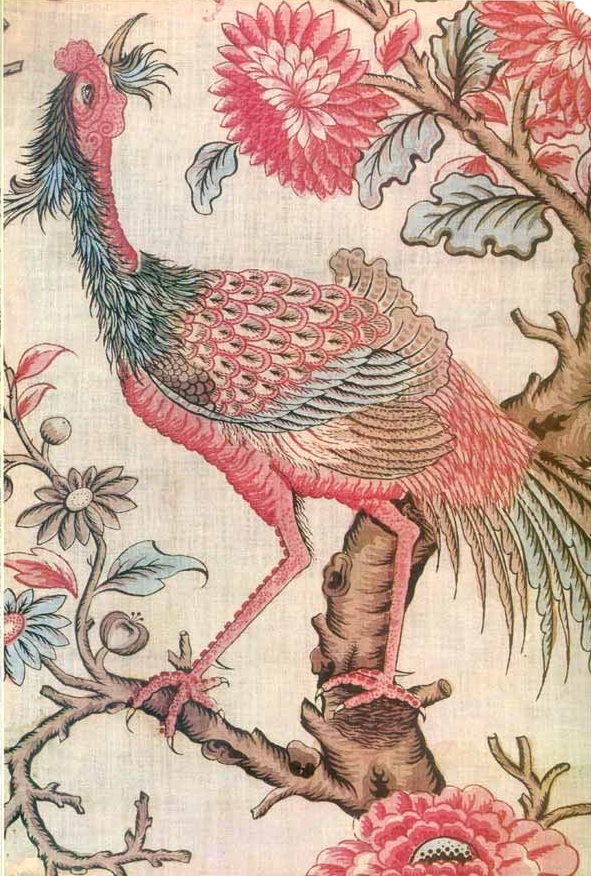
M. I. Yamanovsky's manufactory

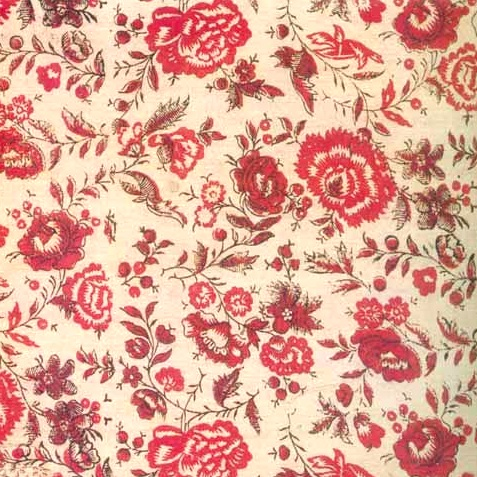
E. I. Grachev's manufactory

In nearby Kokhma, a textile manufactory appeared earlier, in 1720. Though short-lived, it helped spread knowledge of manufactory techniques. Suzdal historian Anany Fyodorov wrote in the mid-18th century:

...the village is large and spacious, rich in construction. Though the houses are wooden, many are very fine. The inhabitants are mostly traders, with few farmers... In the village of Ivanovo... the residents have linen factories, producing various items: canvases, napkins, and the like. Not only in factories but elsewhere, they produce and bleach notable linens, which are esteemed elsewhere, and large quantities are traded in various directions. (Anany Fyodorov, Historical Collection on the God-Saved City of Suzdal...)

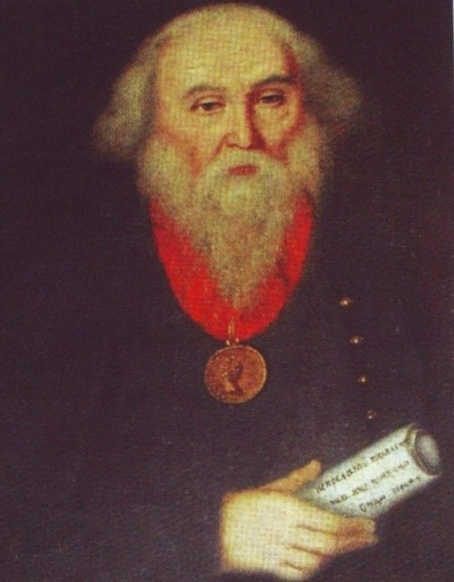
Grachev — one of the richest Ivanovo industrialists

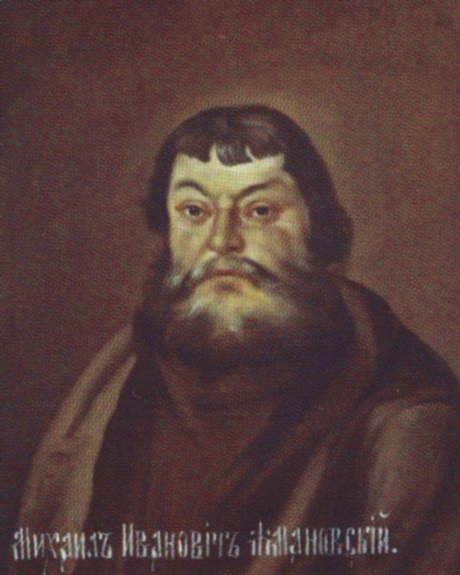
Yamanovsky — one of the richest Ivanovo industrialists

In the second half of the 18th century, block-printing manufactories emerged after weaving ones. An edict by Catherine II on March 17, 1775, allowing free establishment of industrial enterprises, boosted industry growth. Initially, local block-printing quality was low. O. S. Sokov, a former block carver, played a key role in advancing Ivanovo's finishing techniques. Through Ivanovo's ties with Saint Petersburg, Sokov learned of modern methods at the Liman enterprise near Shlisselburg. After visiting, he founded a block-printing manufactory in Ivanovo in 1787, applying Shlisselburg innovations. Sokov's fabrics gained widespread popularity. He soon began finishing not only linen but also cotton fabrics, launching Ivanovo's chintz production. Nearby towns like Kineshma, Plyos, Shuya, and Teikovo also saw textiles dominate. In 1791, Ivanovo opened its first literacy school, teaching reading in Church Slavonic and arithmetic.

By 1795, Ivanovo's population was 4,387, with clear social stratification. "Capitalist peasants" held significant wealth and owned serfs registered under the count, though they chafed under serfdom. In 1795, E. I. Grachev became the first to buy his freedom, at a staggering cost of about 250,000 rubles. A prominent Old Believer and Fedoseevtsy member, Grachev was also a philanthropist. The Popovtsy community was led by M. I. Yamanovsky, who helped convert Sokov's former factory into an Old Believer prayer house. Grachev's manufactory was located at the site of the Samoylov Textile Mill, and Yamanovsky's was near modern Zvereva Street.

== Industrial Revolution ==
At the end of the 18th century, England's shift to mechanized labor led to cheaper English calico flooding the Russian market, displacing domestic linen fabrics. To avoid bankruptcy, Ivanovo entrepreneurs rapidly transitioned to chintz production. By the turn of the century, nearly the entire population of Ivanovo was engaged in textile production. Peasants, including those from nearby villages, worked as hired laborers, quickly amassing funds to establish their own manufactories. A new production method, known as "dispersed manufactory", emerged: yarn was distributed to peasants who wove calico —a semi-finished product for chintz and other fabrics— in their villages, while finishing processes remained in Ivanovo. In 1809, a school opened at the Krestovozdvizhensky Church. By the 1820s, Ivanovo had three primary schools. In 1834, the old literacy school was converted into a men's parish school.

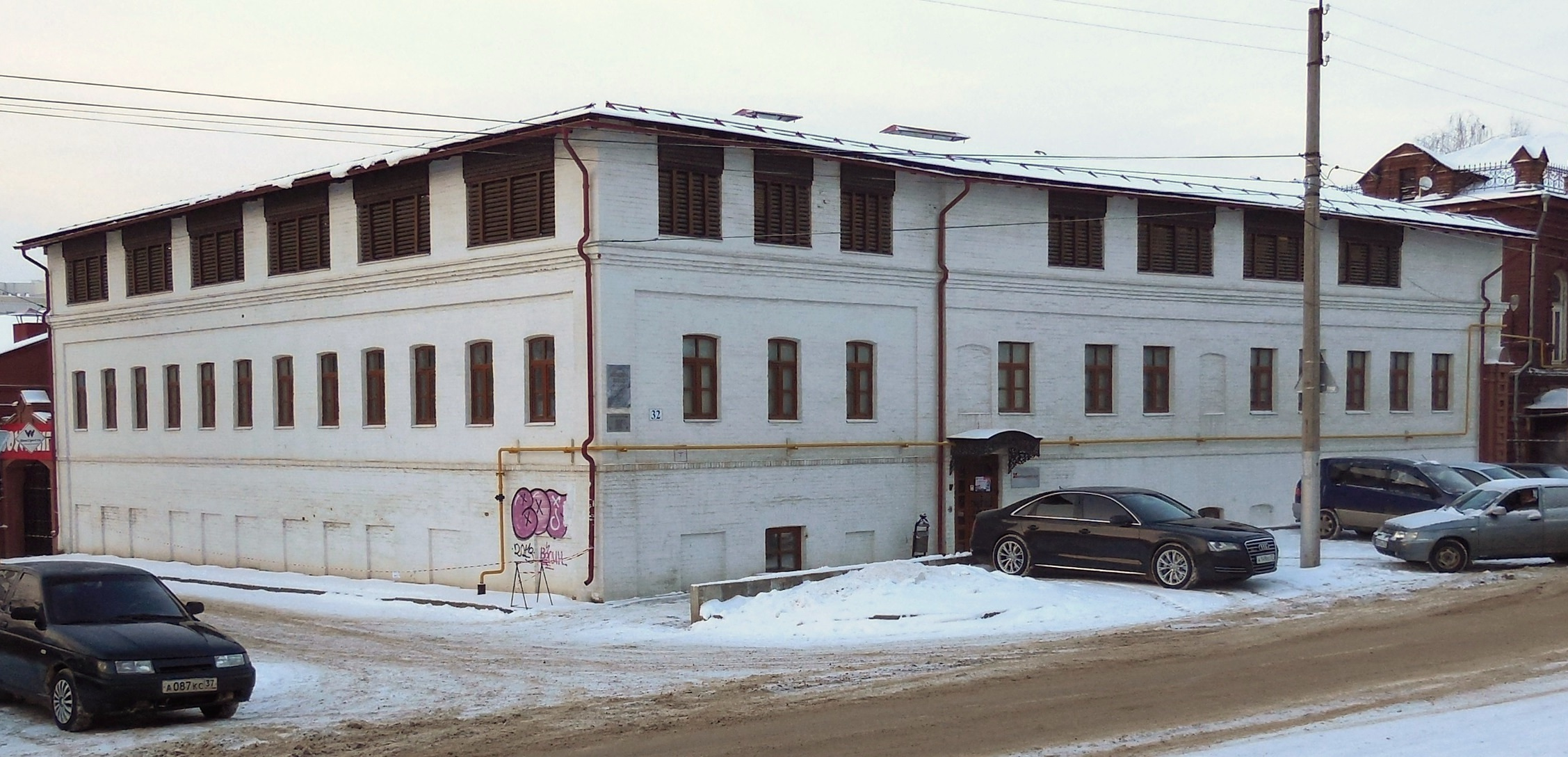
Woodblock printing building of the estate of Ya. N. Fokin's manor house with hangers on the top floor. A typical Ivanov industrial building of the late 18th - early 19th centuries.

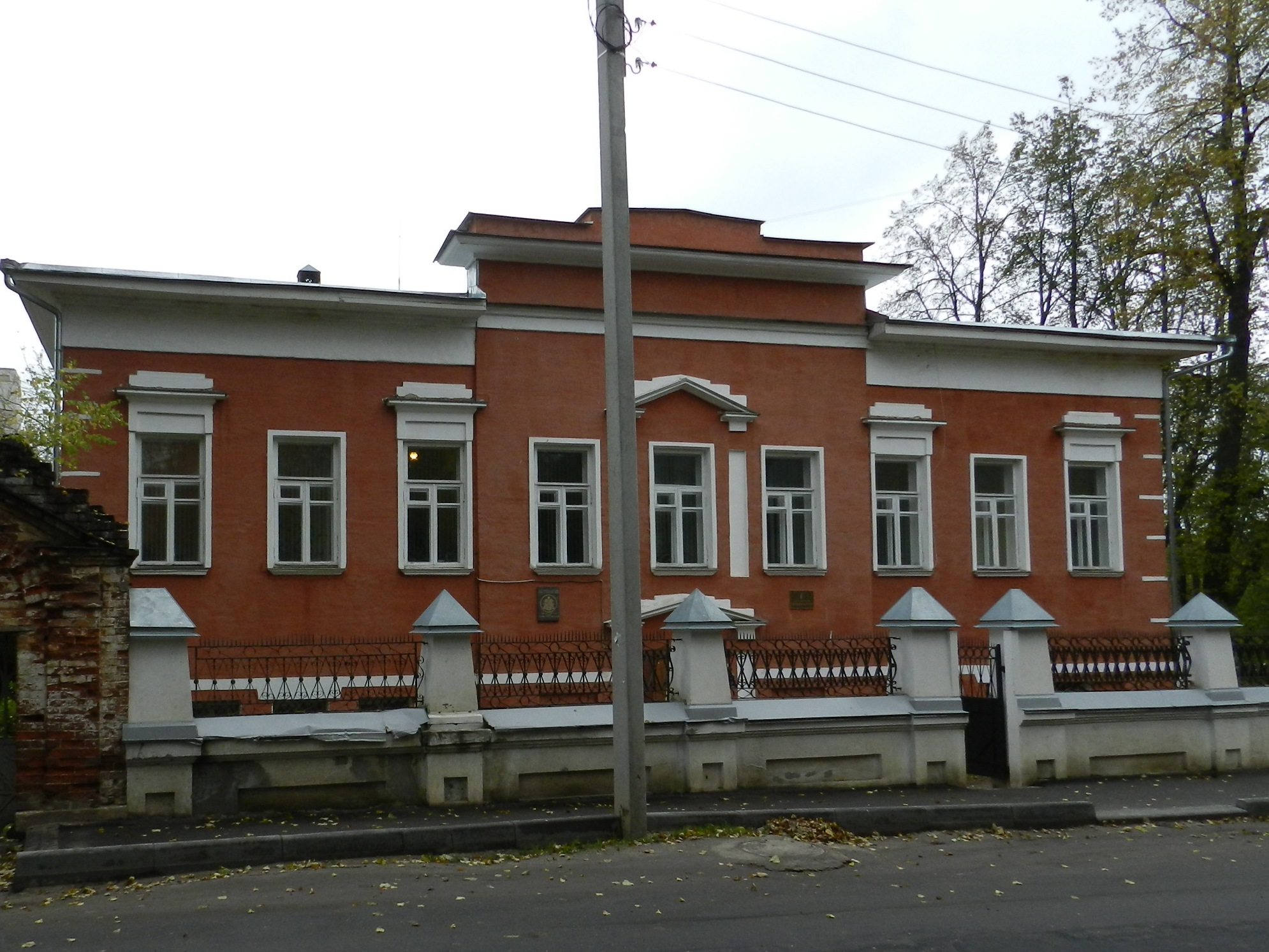
The estate office of the Counts Sheremetevs. Building of the early 19th century.

The Patriotic War of 1812 significantly boosted Ivanovo's industrial growth. The Moscow fire destroyed most of Moscow's major enterprises, increasing demand and prices for textiles. Ivanovo producers, facing little competition, rapidly expanded fabric production. After 1812, foreign specialists began working at Ivanovo enterprises. With E. I. Grachyov's involvement, Old Believer capital and valuables were evacuated from Moscow's Preobrazhenskoye Cemetery to Ivanovo, likely investing part of this wealth into local industry. Growth was remarkable: in 1810, fabric production was valued at 1 million rubles, rising to 7 million by 1817. In 1812, Diodor Burylin founded a manufactory, followed by the Kuvaevs in 1817, the Polushins in 1825, and the Gandurins in 1828. In the 1820s, Ivanovo had about 170 block-printing establishments of varying sizes. The banks of the Uvod River and streams like Potok, Kokuy, and Golyava (a Kokuy tributary) were divided into sections for bleaching, soaking, and boiling fabrics. A 1817 statistical review of Vladimir Governorate noted that Ivanovo's industry "surpasses in trade and craftsmanship not only all cities in this governorate but can compare with prominent cities like Yaroslavl and Kaluga". In the first half of the 19th century, Ivanovo's products were sold at the Nizhny Novgorod Fair, Irbit Fair, Rostov Fair, Korennaya Fair, Ukrainian, Moscow, and local Ivanovo fairs. Central Asia and Persia were key markets, with chintz featuring Eastern patterns produced specifically for them.

Ancillary industries emerged, including chemical, mechanical, metalworking, harness-making, and belt-making enterprises. In the 1820s, Alexey Baburin founded a major chemical plant in Vorobyovo near Ivanovo, pioneering industrial production of wood vinegar for fabric finishing in Russia. Machines first appeared in Ivanovo's competitive finishing sector. In 1826, a cylindrical printing machine, replacing block printers, was installed at D. I. Spiridonov's manufactory in Vorobyovo. In 1832, the Garelin factory introduced the first steam engine. From the late 1840s, large enterprises adopted perrotine printing, and enabling multicolor printing. Soon, the first mechanical cotton-spinning factory was established.

About half of Ivanovo's manufacturers bought their freedom between 1825 and 1833, joining the merchant class, but their property remained owned by the landlord, requiring them to lease their factories and land. To gain independence, they built factories outside the village, leading to the growth of settlements around Ivanovo. In 1820, Vorobyovskaya Sloboda (renamed Ilinskaya after the Ilinsky Church) emerged near Vorobyovo. In 1828, Dmitrievskaya Sloboda (near modern Rabfakovskaya Street) began developing. In the 1840s, Voznesenskaya (around Lenin Square and Baturin Street) and Troitskaya (near K. Marx Street) slobodas formed, encircling Ivanovo from the southwest, west, and north. A devastating 1839 fire, which destroyed most of the village and its main factories, further spurred sloboda development. In 1845, Ivanovo opened a post office.

By the 1850s, the largest enterprises were mechanized, though many still relied on manual labor. Cotton weaving expanded significantly. Weaving enterprises were the last to mechanize, with the first mechanical looms installed in 1853 at Ya. P. Garelin's factory. From the mid-19th century, Ivanovo's textile industry faced supply chain risks. Raw materials, fuel, and dyes were sourced from distant regions and abroad (cotton from the US, Egypt, and Turkestan, fuel from Baku and Donbas, and most synthetic dyes from Germany). Large enterprises preferred high-quality American cotton. In the early 1860s, the American Civil War disrupted U.S. cotton supplies to Europe, causing difficulties for Ivanovo's factories. This prompted a shift to Turkestan cotton. After the 1861 reform, the industrial revolution entered its final phase.

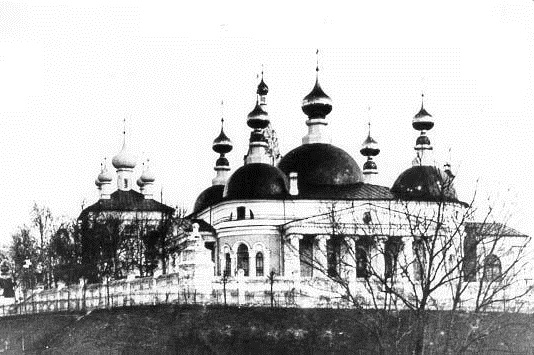
Trinity Cathedral (1819). Now Pushkin Square.

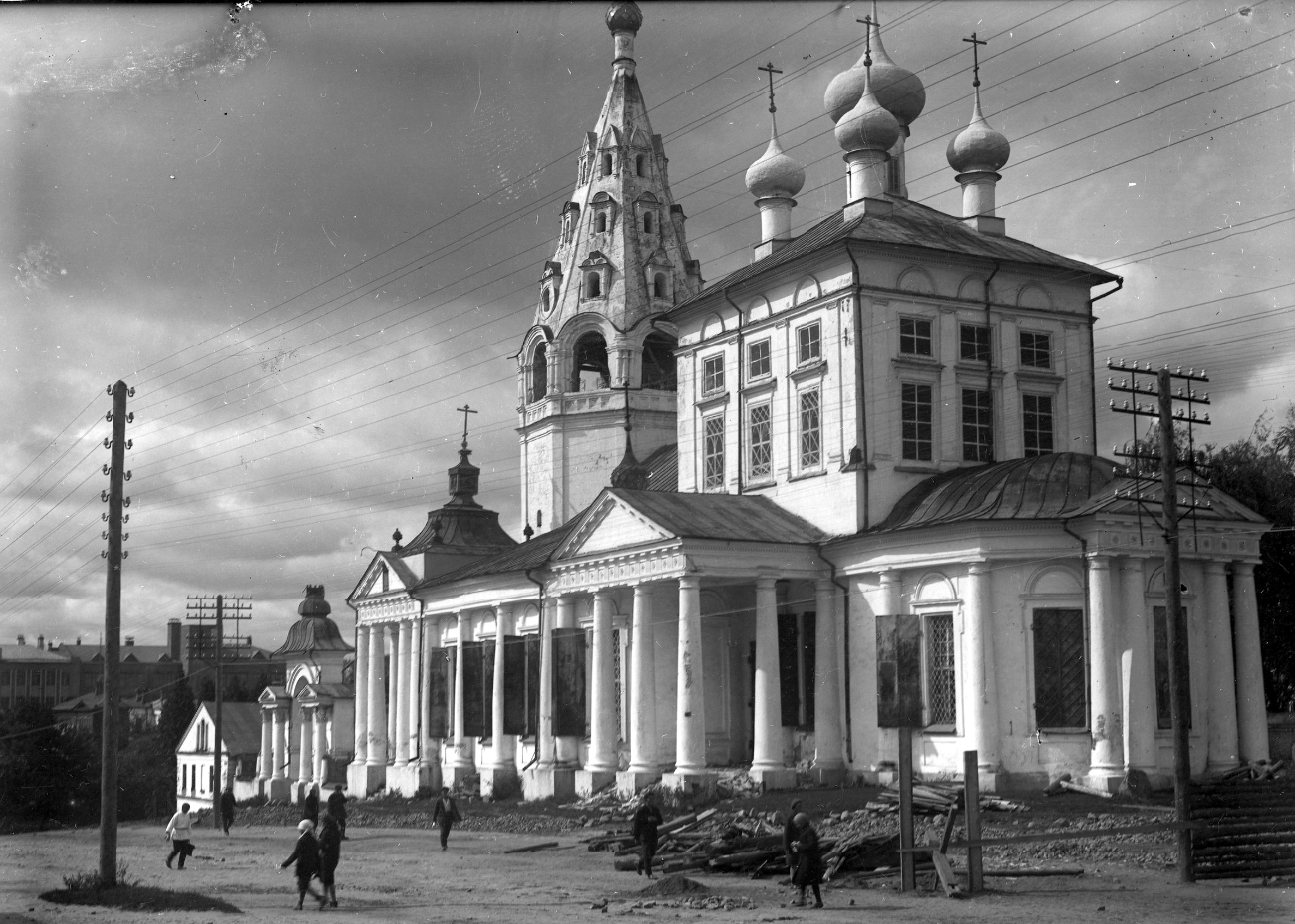
Intercession Cathedral (1693). Now Pushkin Square.

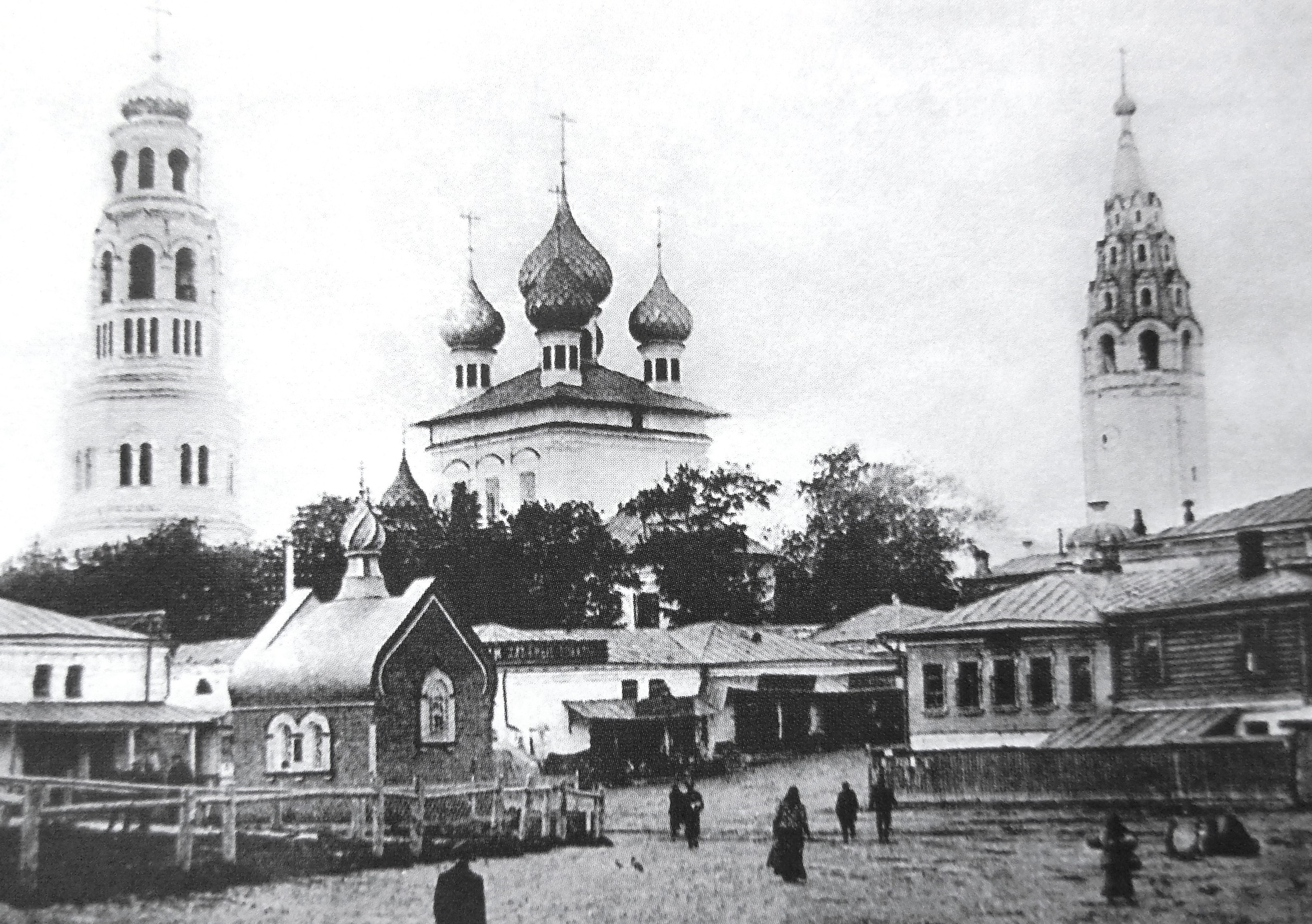
Temple ensemble. The Church of the Holy Cross (1795), old (the beginning of the 18th century) and new (1858) bell towers. Now Revolution Square.

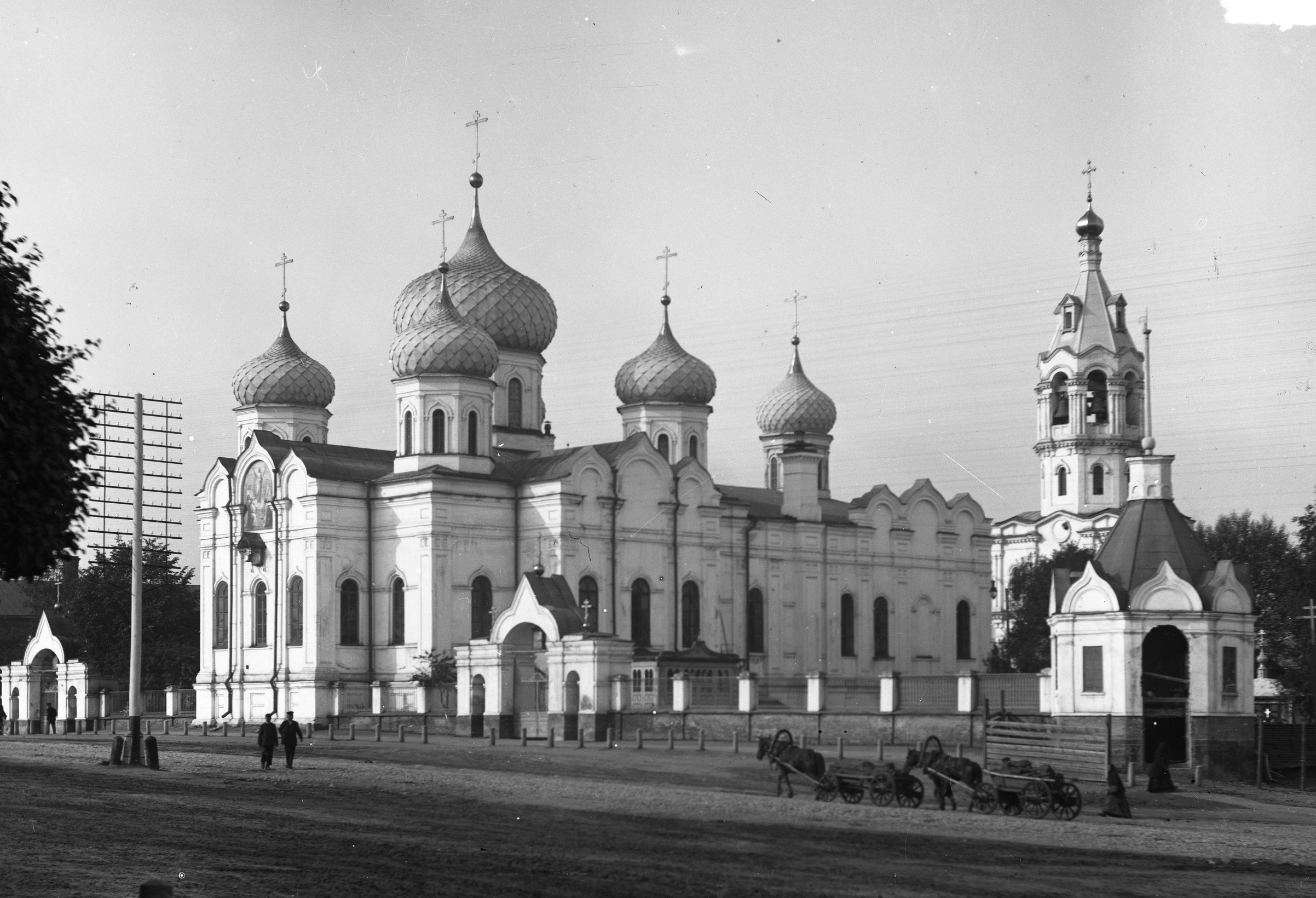
Ascension church (1851). Now here stands house No. 43 on Lenin avenue.

In 1819, the Trinity Cathedral was built on the former Pokrovsky Monastery site, closed in 1764. Four years earlier, the wooden Trinity Church was relocated to the Uspensky Cemetery and consecrated in honor of the Dormition of the Mother of God. In the 1820s, a chapel for the Theodore Icon, a long-venerated village relic, was built on the main square. In the first half of the 19th century, Shuysky Uyezd became a center of Edinoverie in Vladimir Governorate. Ivanovo's Edinoverie parish formed in 1839 after the consecration of the Annunciation Edinoverie Church. By the late 19th century, Old Belief influence waned. In the mid-19th century, a new bell tower and Church of the Nativity of Christ were built on Ivanovo's main square. In Voznesenskaya Sloboda, the Voznesensky Church, designed by K. A. Thon, and a nearby bell tower were constructed.

== Ivanovo-Voznesensk formation ==
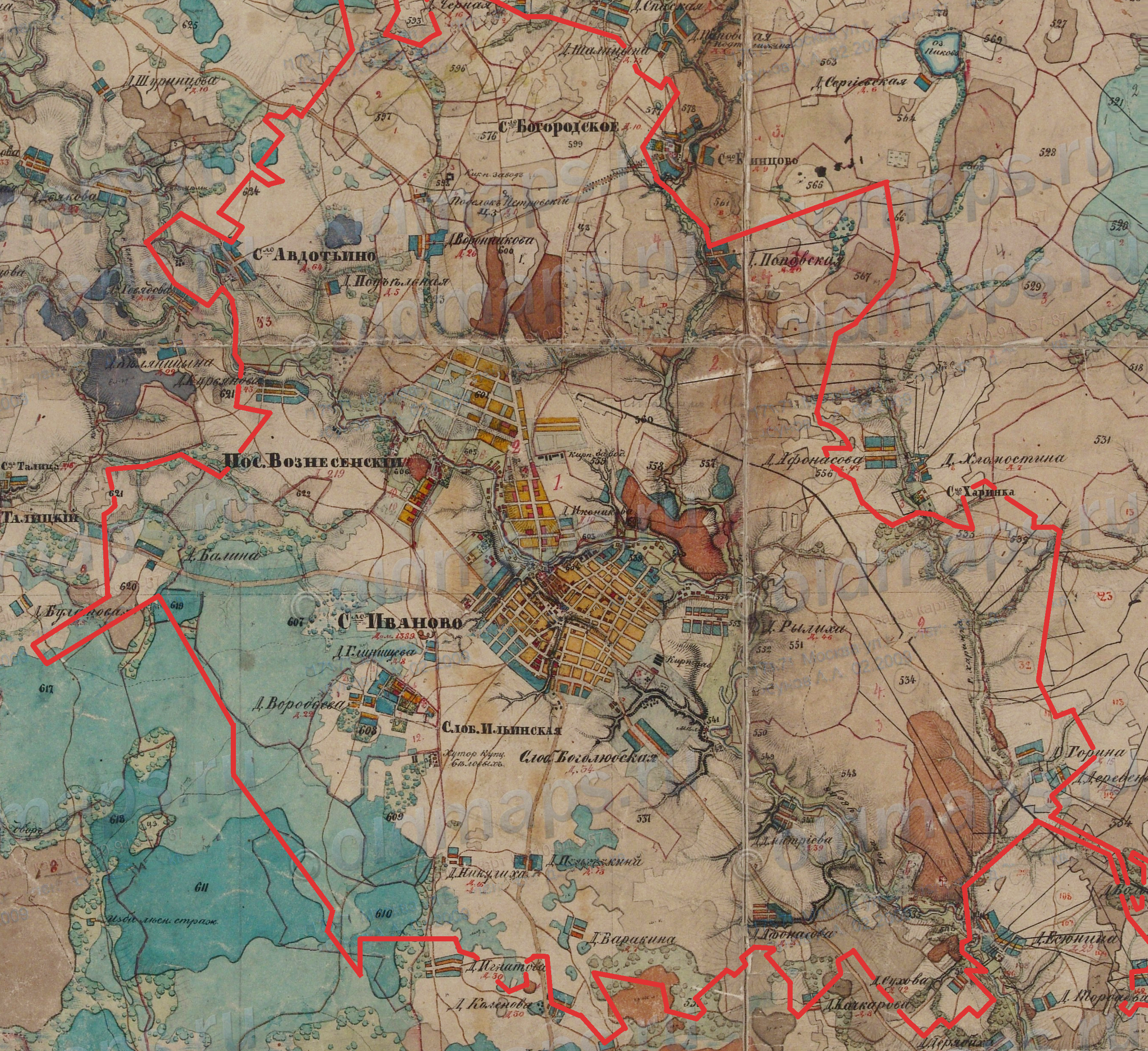
Ivanovo village, Voznesensky Posad and its surroundings. Map by A. I. Mende from the 1850s. Red lines indicate the boundaries of the city as of the early 2010s.

In 1845, Governor P. M. Donaurov requested the Minister of Internal Affairs to establish a city near the village of Ivanovo in Voznesenskaya Sloboda, but the proposal was rejected. By a decree dated December 9 (21), 1853, Voznesenskaya, Dmitrievskaya (Dmitrovskaya), Ilinskaya, Troitskaya slobodas, and other territories (Note: From the slobodas of Voznesenskaya, Dmitrovskaya, Ilinskaya, Troitskaya, Berezniki, and the wasteland of Kovrigina, Shuysky Uyezd, Vladimir Governorate, with all the lands belonging to these slobodas, form a posad named Voznesensky. (Decree on the formation of Voznesensky).) were merged to form Voznesensky Posad. In 1857, the posad had 3,500 residents, while the village of Ivanovo had about 9,000. The posad lagged behind the village in population, industry, and culture. Kostromskaya Street, leading to Kostroma, became the posad's main street, with the Voznesensky Church and its bell tower as its central feature.

Ya. P. Garelin (1820–1890) — manufacturer, philanthropist, and local historian, a key advocate for the city's formation

In 1869, efforts to create a city began. Proposed names included Ivanovo-Voznesensk, Ivanovsky Posad, and Alexandrovsk (after Emperor Alexander II). On July 21 (August 2), 1871, Alexander II approved the Committee of Ministers' decision to merge the village of Ivanovo and Voznesensky Posad into the non-uyezd city of Ivanovo-Voznesensk. The first meeting of the Ivanovo-Voznesensk city duma was held on June 6 (18), 1872. The city formation process concluded in 1873. On August 30 (September 11), the Pokrovsky Church was designated the city cathedral, with celebrations attended by Governor V. N. Strukov and Archbishop Anthony. However, July 21 (August 2), 1871, is typically considered the city's founding date.

The first head of Ivanovo-Voznesensk was manufacturer P. S. Borisov. In 1877, Ya. P. Garelin, a leading proponent of the city's creation, became head. Under his leadership, large-scale urban improvements and greening began. In the 1870s and early 1880s, the former unappealing village gradually acquired urban features: central streets were paved with cobblestones, street lighting was introduced, and transportation was improved by building dams across ravines. However, persistent issues remained unresolved, including cleaning the Uvod River, which had become a foul sewer due to factory waste, building a water supply system, and establishing an intra-city transport system.

By the 1870s, nearly all Ivanovo textile enterprises, except for a few small workshops, were mechanized. Perrotine printing was replaced by advanced cylindrical machines. Weaving enterprises still used mechanical looms, though some Russian factories began adopting automated ones. Finishing remained dominant, with few cotton-spinning factories to meet weaving needs. In the late 19th century, mechanical manufactories grew rapidly. The city had dozens of enterprises, but about 15 major cotton factories defined its industrial strength: those of the Garelins, Zubkovs, Polushins, Vitovs, Fokins, N. Derbenyov, Kokushkin and Marakushev, A. Gandurin, N. and L. Gandurins, D. G. Burylin, A. Novikov, Ivanovo-Voznesensk Weaving, Kuvaevskaya, and Pokrovskaya manufactories. From the mid-19th century, Ivanovo earned the nicknames "chintz kingdom" and "Russian Manchester," referencing Manchester's global textile fame. Local factories targeted peasants and workers, producing affordable but low-quality chintz, with smaller quantities of expensive, high-quality fabrics.

In 1886, electric welding, invented by N. N. Benardos, was first used in production at the Kuvaevskaya Manufactory and a machine-building plant, a global first.

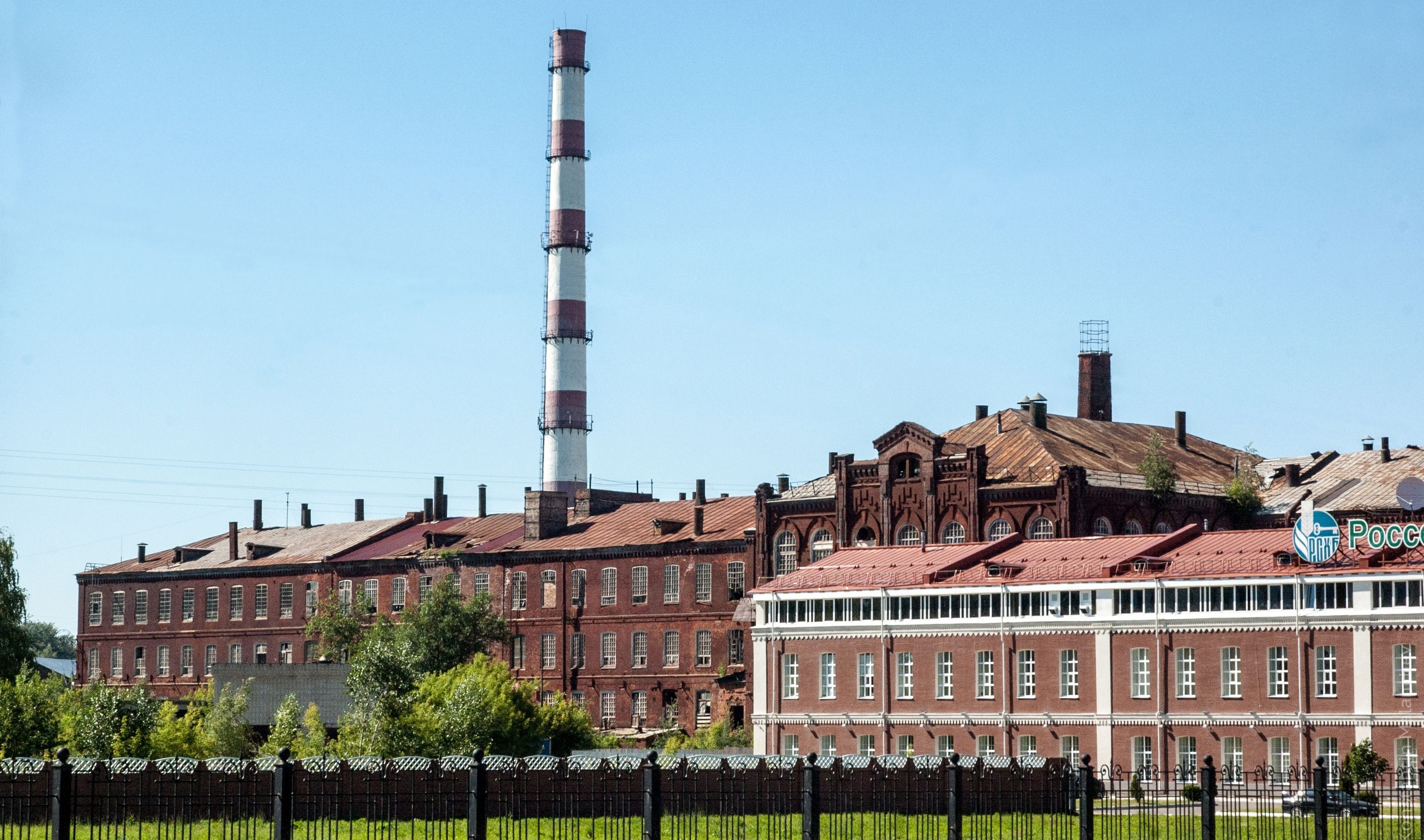
Kuvaevskaya Manufactory (Bolshaya Ivanovskaya Manufaktuya) — one of the largest factories of pre-revolutionary Ivanovo

In 1871, Count D. N. Sheremetev died. His heir, S. D. Sheremetev, was no longer Ivanovo's landlord, as it became part of the new city, but maintained ties with the region. Opinions on the Sheremetevs' role in Ivanovo's development vary. Professor A. A. Kornikov of Ivanovo State University argues they viewed the village solely as a revenue source, investing nothing, allowing peasants, including industrialists, to buy freedom only on exploitative terms, opposing city formation, and neglecting village improvements. Conversely, A. M. Semenenko, deputy chair of the Ivanovo Regional Historical Society, believes the Sheremetevs left a positive legacy by encouraging early manufactories in the 18th century, engaging in philanthropy, and offering significant discounts on land purchases post-1861 reform. The role of Voznesensky Posad in the city's formation remains debated.

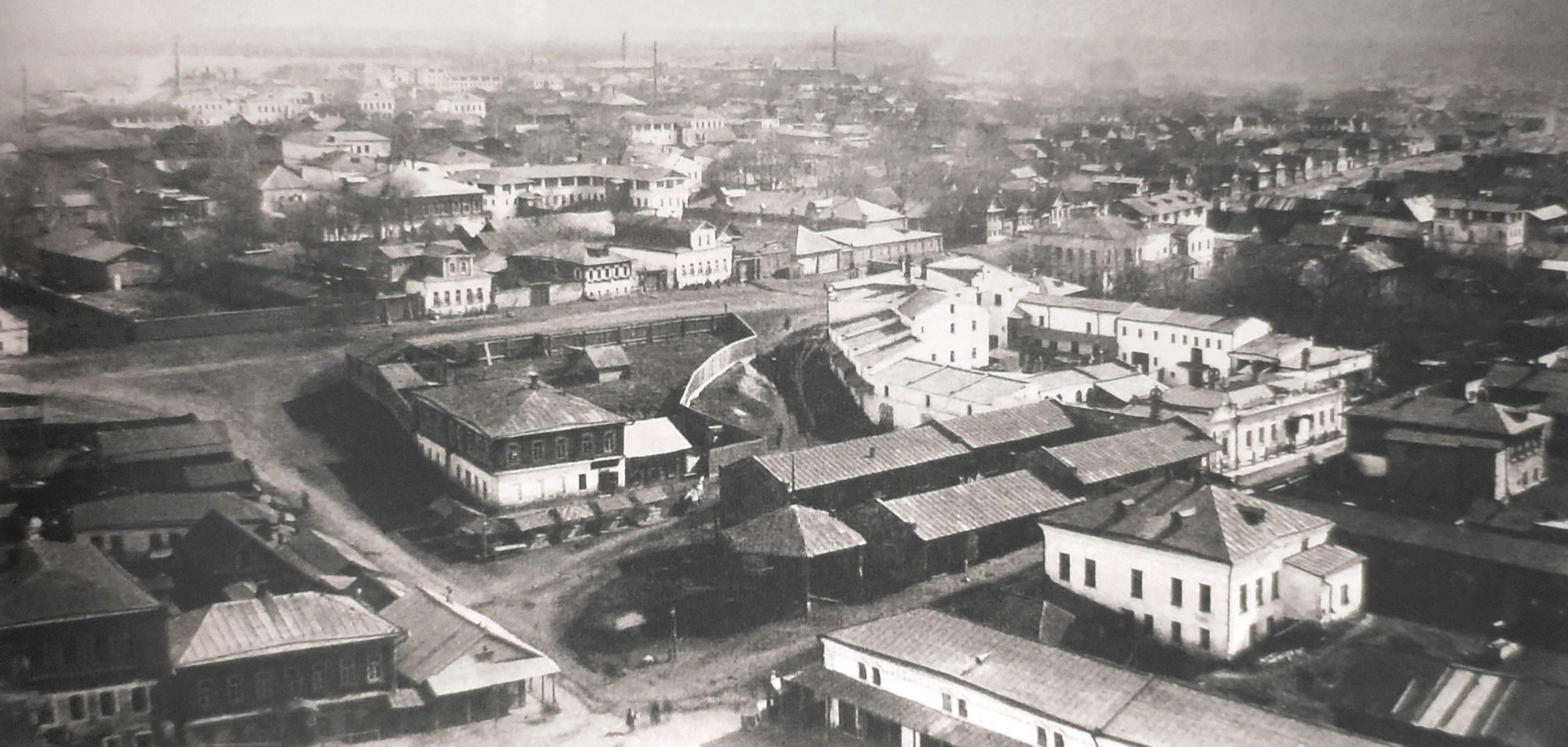
View of Kokuy and Fedorovskaya streets (now 10th August and Krasnogvardeyskaya). Photo from the 1890s.

In 1868, the Shuya-Ivanovo Railway connected Voznesensky Posad to Novki station on the Moscow-Nizhny Novgorod Railway (now Gorky Railway). In 1871, a railway to Kineshma was built, and in the 1890s, one to Moscow. These railways strengthened trade links with other regions. Ivanovo-Voznesensk became the center of the informal Ivanovo-Voznesensk Industrial District, encompassing textile hubs in northern Vladimir Governorate (Shuya, Teikovo, Yuzha, Lezhnevo) and southern Kostroma Governorate (Kineshma, Vichuga, Rodniki, Sereda, Yakovlevskoye). Sometimes called the Ivanovo-Kineshma District, it highlighted Kineshma's role as a Volga transport hub. In the late 19th century, fairs lost significance, except for the Nizhny Novgorod Fair. Moscow's trading platforms became central. By the late 19th to early 20th centuries, Ivanovo-Voznesensk's affordable chintz was sold across the Russian Empire, with Persia as a key external market and China to a lesser extent.

Ivanovo-Voznesensk's toponymic system was unusually complex, deviating from Russian norms. A single object could have multiple names, with no clear distinction between official and unofficial designations. City authorities might approve a street name but use different names in official documents. Streets were often divided into block segments, each with multiple names. This complexity likely stemmed from the city's chaotic urban planning, lacking clear zoning and with buildings frequently changing functions, altering residents' routes and neighborhood significance.

In the late 19th century, peasant migration to Ivanovo-Voznesensk for work surged, bringing rural traditions. Many returned to villages in warmer months for seasonal work. Ivanovo peasants bought their freedom by 1869. New districts emerged around the city: Novaya Bogolyubovka (now Balashovka), settlements Novaya Ryliha, Ushakovo, Efremkovo, and Bulatovo (now part of Nezhdanovo), and Yamy. In the late 19th century, slobodas Novo-Troitskaya, Uspenskaya, Nikolskaya, Preobrazhenskaya (now Mineevo and Pustosh-Bor), Petropavlovskaya, Zavertyaiha (now Khutorovo), and Kotel'nitsy (now near Korotkov and Schmidt streets) appeared. These areas were incorporated into the city in 1917 and 1922.

Despite extensive construction, housing remained a problem. Many low-skilled rural workers lived in overcrowded rented apartments or dormitories. Working conditions were poor: textile workers suffered from tuberculosis due to cotton fiber inhalation; finishing workshops had toxic fumes; workshops lacked ventilation; weaving rooms' noise caused deafness; and tightly packed machines increased injuries. Environmental issues, including poor well water and Uvod River pollution, harmed residents' health. Healthcare development was limited by budget constraints, relying heavily on philanthropy. In 1897, a city hospital (now the 1st City Clinical Hospital) opened, followed by Kuvaevskaya Hospital in 1910.

In the 1870s–1880s, 5% of Ivanovo-Voznesensk workers were a "labor aristocracy"—highly skilled specialists earning 30–40 rubles monthly with benefits. Two-thirds, main trade workers, earned 10–15 rubles, while nearly one-third, unskilled laborers, earned 7–10 rubles. Pre-revolutionary factories primarily employed men.

Academic V. P. Bezobrazov highlighted the contradictions of Russian capitalism in Ivanovo:

One of the most characteristic features of the Ivanovo world is the remarkable combination and intertwining of threads of Russian antiquity, long outdated for educated classes, with phenomena of Europe's extreme manufactory industrialism. This extreme factory and mercantile spirit, industrial boldness, European fashion, polish, and comfort, progressive phrases from leading journals, and attempts at women's emancipation coexist with strict fasts, ancient ritual formalism, lamentations, female seclusion, and inherited moral severity. (V. P. Bezobrazov, essay Village of Ivanovo, published in Otechestvennye Zapiski, 1864)

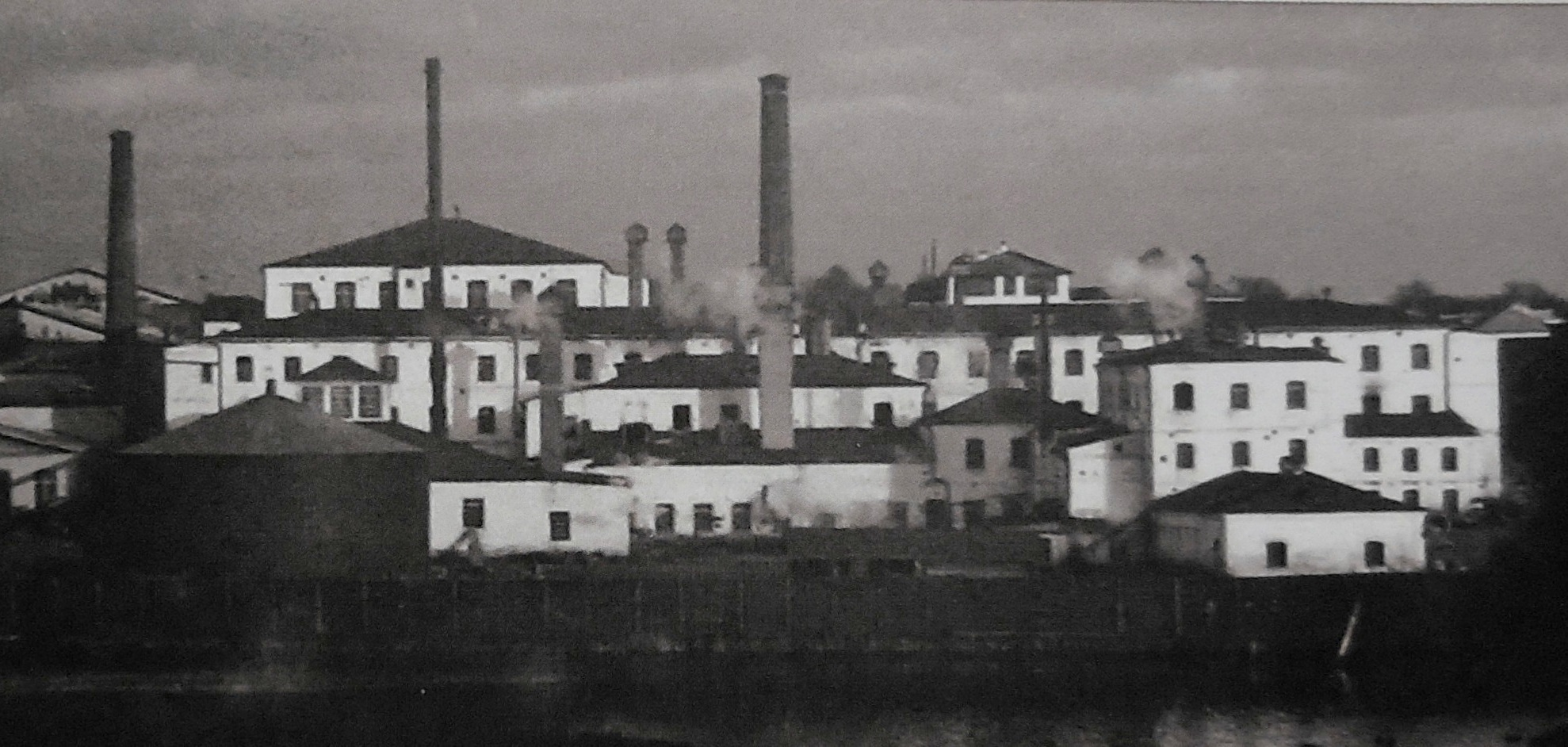
Factory in Ivanovo-Voznesensk

Bezobrazov noted Ivanovo's stark social stratification, with wealth and poverty in close proximity. Prince I. M. Dolgoruky described the immense fortunes of local manufacturers, observing, "In Ivanovo, there is no middle ground—either a pauper or a rich man." Local writers depicted Ivanovo negatively, calling it a "quiet pool", "black city", "kingdom of chintz and consumption", "realm of darkness and sweat", or "devil's swamp", the latter coined by F. D. Nefyodov, a prominent Ivanovo writer and friend of revolutionary S. G. Nechaev, who lived in Ivanovo for his first 18 years.

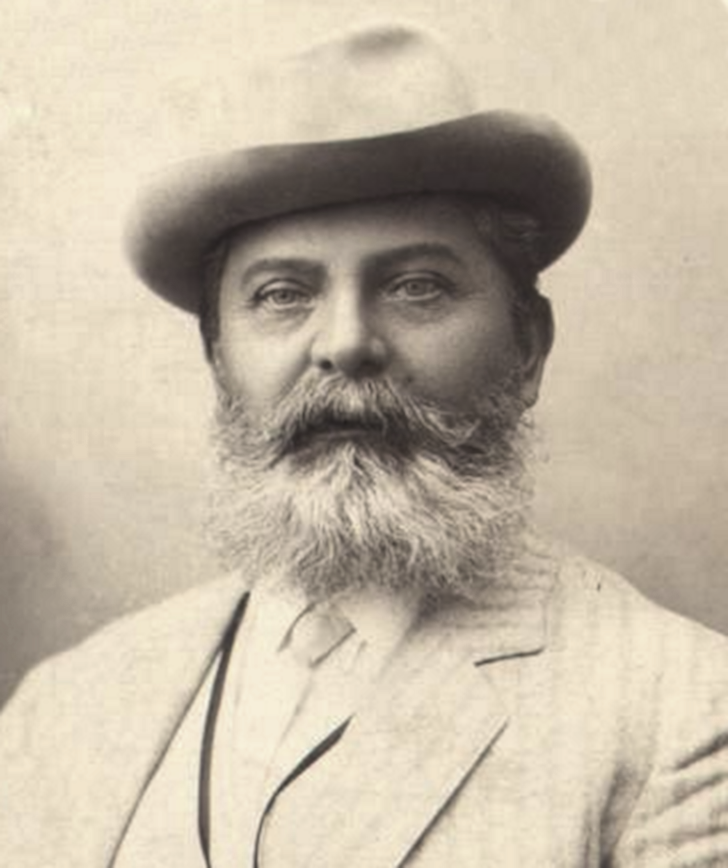
D. G. Burylin (1852–1924) — factory owner, philanthropist and collector. Founder of the Museum of Industry and Art

Though Great Russians dominated "Russian Manchester" in the late 19th to early 20th centuries, the city's industrial nature attracted diverse groups. A Polish diaspora emerged in the late 19th century, valued as skilled specialists. A Jewish diaspora existed, despite the city's distance from the Pale of Settlement. A Muslim community, mostly Tatars, was present. By the turn of the century, the city had dozens of Protestants, about 100 Poles, 200 Jews, and slightly more Muslims.

Progressive industrialists recognized the importance of education. In 1847, Ya. P. Garelin opened a school at his manufactory, educating over 100 children within 20 years. In 1861, a primary school for girls opened in Voznesensky Posad. In 1868, Garelin sponsored the first vocational school for artisans and workers. He also supported a public library and hospital for workers in the 1860s.

In 1873, the first real school opened, attended by sons of entrepreneurs and officials. In 1878, a women's pro-gymnasium, later a gymnasium, was established. A men's gymnasium opened in 1909. By the century's end, about 20 schools of various types operated. Factories faced a shortage of skilled workers, addressed in the 1890s–early 1900s with a lower mechanical-technical school, colorist school, drawing school, trade school, and lower craft school. Significant funds from the city budget and entrepreneurs supported vocational education, with high training standards attracting students beyond Ivanovo-Voznesensk, making the city a major vocational education center. By 1914, Ivanovo had 37 free primary schools, consuming one-fifth of the city budget. However, education remained inaccessible to the poorest, failing to meet all residents' needs.

In the early 20th century, Ivanovo-Voznesensk had eight cinemas, the largest being "Buff" on present-day Pushkin Square. Three theaters operated: the winter theater of the clerks' club, the summer theater in Grafsky Garden, and Vasily Demidov's theater in Yamy, popular among workers due to cheap tickets.

Manufacturer D. G. Burylin amassed significant collections of art, antiques, and rare items, including unique universal astronomical clocks, Masonic and textile collections, and an Egyptian mummy. In 1914, a museum building was constructed for his collection.

== Revolutionary movement ==
The large and well-organized proletariat in Ivanovo-Voznesensk attracted the revolutionaries' attention, while the unsatisfactory conditions of most workers and high social tensions contributed to the spread of revolutionary and strike movements. According to Soviet historian P. M. Ekzemplyarsky, the first Ivanovo-Voznesensk strike took place in 1871. In 1875, a group of Narodniks arrived in Ivanovo-Voznesensk to conduct propaganda work. They cited their lack of qualifications as the reason for not seeking employment at Moscow factories, earning them the nickname "clumsy weavers" in historical accounts. A few months after beginning their activities, they were arrested. These "clumsy weavers" were part of the prominent Trial of the Fifty. In 1885, several thousand weavers went on strike, demanding higher wages and the elimination of night shifts. As a result of the strike, the authorities made some concessions. Overall, the strikes of this period were sporadic and disorganized.

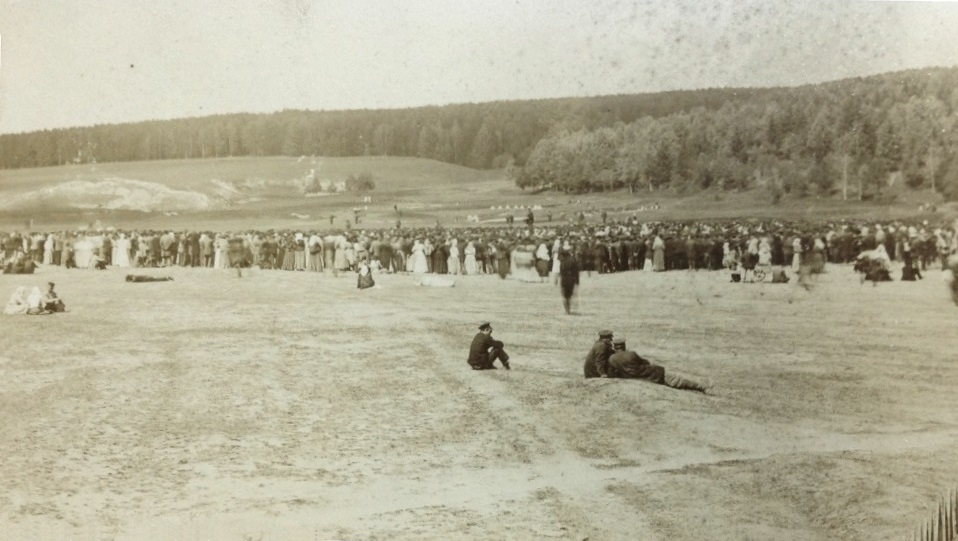
Workers' strike at the Talka River in 1905

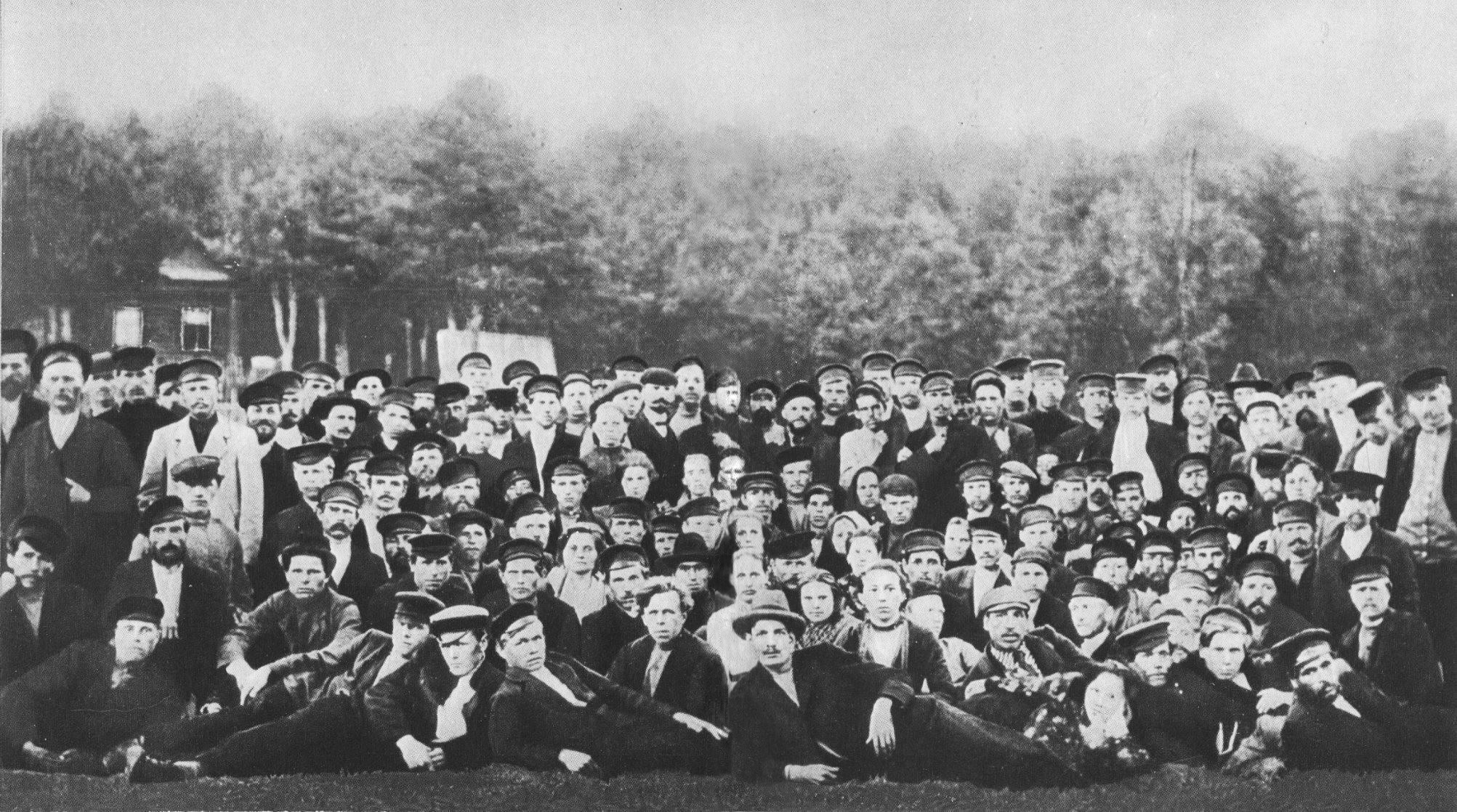
Deputies of the Council of Workers' Deputies by the Talka River in 1905

In 1892, St. Petersburg student F. A. Kondratyev founded the city's first Marxist circle. In 1895, several Marxist circles united to form the "Workers' Union", led by Kondratyev, O. A. Varentsova, N. N. Kudryashov, and M. A. Bagaev. In 1896, many of the union's organizers were arrested, but underground Marxist activities continued. The experienced underground activist F. A. Afanasyev ("Father") arrived in the city and later led the local Bolsheviks. In 1898, the Marxist organizations of Ivanovo-Voznesensk and Kokhma merged, forming the Ivanovo-Voznesensk Committee of the RSDLP.

The workers of Ivanovo-Voznesensk actively participated in the Russian Revolution of 1905. On May 25, 1905, a general strike began in the city, involving about 30,000 workers from nearly all local enterprises. The strikers presented around 30 demands to factory owners, primarily economic in nature (such as a guaranteed minimum wage increase, an 8-hour workday, benefits, and improved sanitary and technical working conditions), but also included political demands, insisted upon by the RSDLP, such as the convocation of a Constituent Assembly, the introduction of democratic freedoms, and the celebration of May Day.

Chintz fabrics
late 19th – early 20th centuries

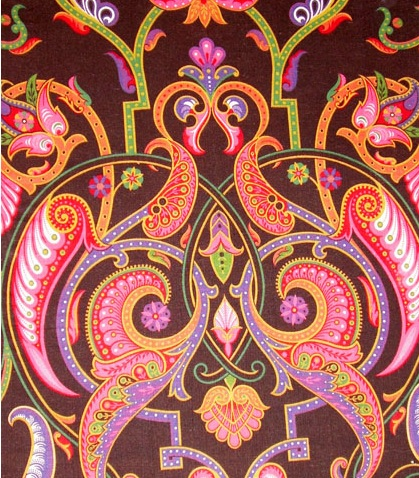
Kuvaevskaya Manufactor

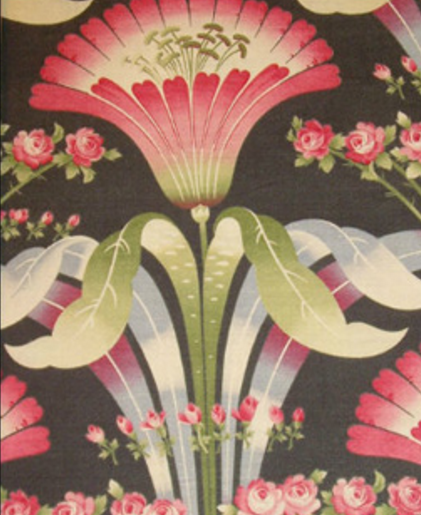
Fokins Manufactory

On May 28, 1905, during the strike, the Ivanovo-Voznesensk City Council of Workers' Deputies was elected. The term Council of Workers' Deputies was applied to it only after 1917. The elections were initiated by entrepreneurs who were unwilling to negotiate with a crowd. Contrary to their expectations, the elected deputies refused to negotiate on a factory-by-factory basis and instead formed a citywide Council. This was the first citywide Soviet in Russia. It consisted of 151 deputies, predominantly Bolshevik in ideology, almost entirely proletarian in class composition, and very young, with an average age of 23. The council was led by a presidium of six members, chaired by worker-engraver and poet A. E. Nozdrin. The Council included strike, financial, food, propaganda, and workers' militia committees, the latter led by I. N. Utkin ("Stanko"). After prolonged negotiations, factory owners made some concessions: the workday was reduced (to an average of 10.5 hours), wages were increased, and short maternity leave was introduced. However, most demands were not met. The Council ceased its activities on August 1, 1905. Some researchers suggest that the strike and the council's work reflected traditions of rural community gatherings brought by workers from rural areas, and that the role of the Bolsheviks in these events may have been exaggerated.

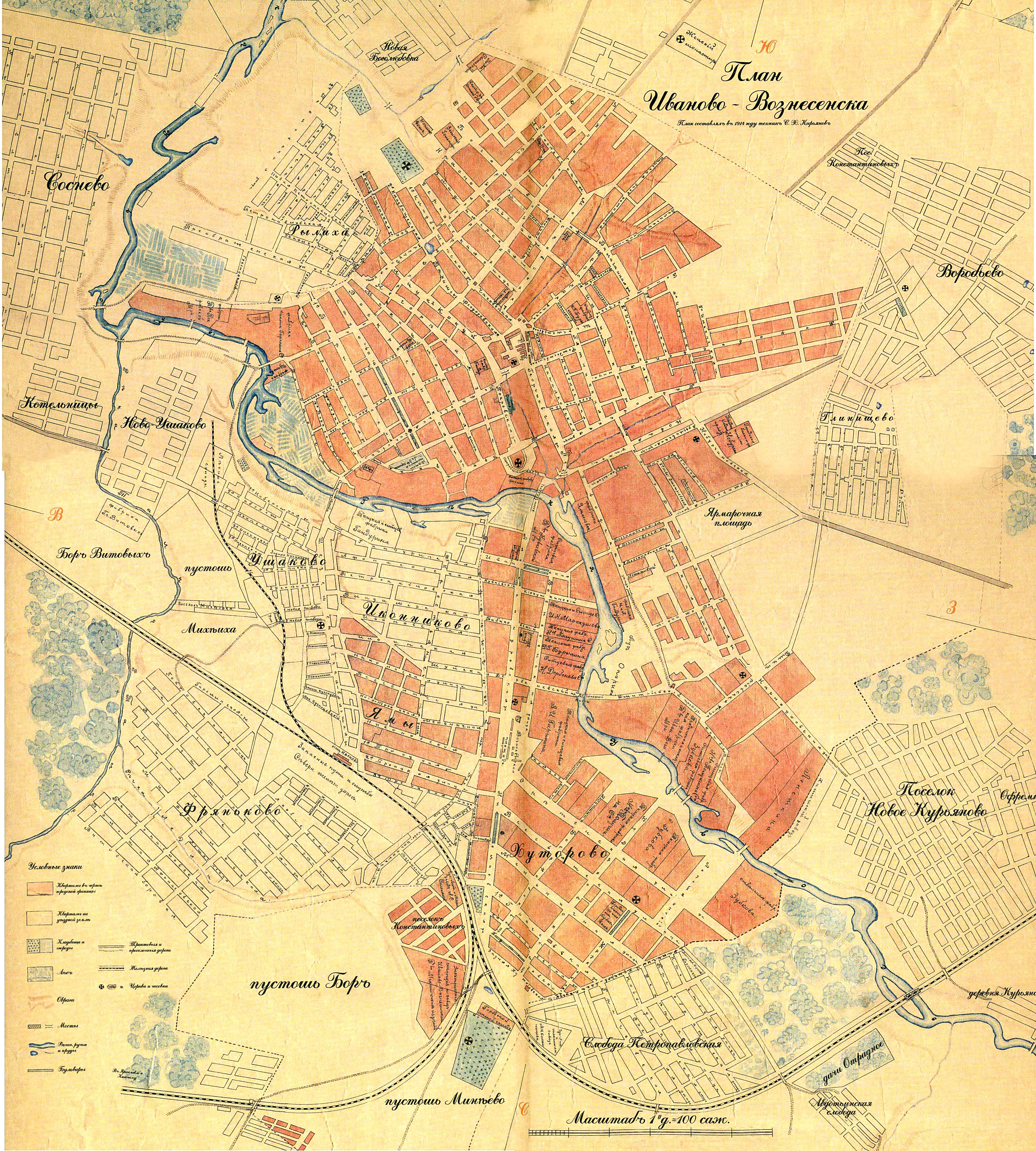
Map of Ivanovo-Voznesensk, compiled by E. Kh. Kiryanov in 1914 (the map is inverted)

In October 1905, the All-Russian political strike broke out, and Ivanovo-Voznesensk workers joined it on October 30. Soon, actions by right-wing radicals led to Jewish pogroms. Police and Cossacks attempted to prevent the violence, which dealt a severe blow to the city's Jewish community. In October–November, clashes and shootouts occurred between Black Hundreds and Bolshevik militants, with former Council deputies facing persecution. On November 4, 1905, Black Hundreds killed F. A. Afanasyev near the Talka River, and on November 29, revolutionary O. M. Genkina, who had brought weapons for the Bolsheviks, was also killed. In December 1905, a Bolshevik combat unit from Ivanovo-Voznesensk and Shuya, led by M. V. Frunze, went to Moscow to participate in the armed uprising.

In early 1906, the revolutionary movement subsided, and public activity shifted to legal forms. The Bolsheviks maintained a strong presence in the city, dominating trade unions, while the Socialist Revolutionaries had much less influence. Right-wing parties were also active. In November 1905, the Ivanovo-Voznesensk Autocratic-Monarchist Party was established, but its role in the city's socio-political life became negligible during World War I. From December 1905 to February 26, 1906, the Octobrists held eight public meetings and developed a program that diverged from the central party line, prioritizing the State Duma over tsarist authority and interpreting the October Manifesto as a gain for the Russian people, advocating for broad democratic freedoms. A meeting of the Constitutional Democratic Party in support of the First State Duma was attended by Central Committee member P. B. Struve. However, the Constitutional Democrats failed to gain traction with Central Russian trade unions, and their Ivanovo-Voznesensk branch quickly dissolved.

The city grew rapidly. In 1897, it had a population of 54,000 (48th in the Russian Empire), but by 1914, it had risen to 146,000, ranking 17th. The local industry weathered the economic crisis of the early 1900s relatively well. In 1913, industrialists formed a cartel, the "Society of Manufacturers and Factory Owners of the Ivanovo-Voznesensk Industrial District". Ivanovo-Voznesensk became the leading textile center of the Russian Empire. The city housed around 50 significant textile enterprises and related factories. From the late 19th century, the local branch of the Russian Technical Society disseminated information on technical and technological innovations in the textile industry.

With the outbreak of World War I in 1914, production in Ivanovo-Voznesensk sharply declined. The situation was exacerbated by a shortage of fabric dyes, previously imported from Germany since the mid-19th century. Production fell by 12% in 1914 and 23% in 1916. A more significant decline was avoided due to military orders, with most enterprises producing goods for the army. Rapid inflation and a food crisis led to a resurgence of the strike movement. In August 1915, a strike with political and anti-war demands took place, with workers demanding the release of arrested colleagues. When the police chief refused, a crowd marched across the Prikazny Bridge toward Kokuy Street, where the prison was located. Near Dunyushkina's buildings (now 10 August Street, 29), soldiers fired on the protesters, killing 30 people, including Bolshevik leader G. S. Zinoviev ("Fyodor"). In late 1916–early 1917, a spontaneous strike with economic demands occurred.

The events of 1917 in Ivanovo-Voznesensk, as in the capitals, were preceded by a food crisis. On March 6, 1917, police searched traders but found negligible food reserves. The city administration admitted that flour was insufficient even for hospitals and infirmaries.

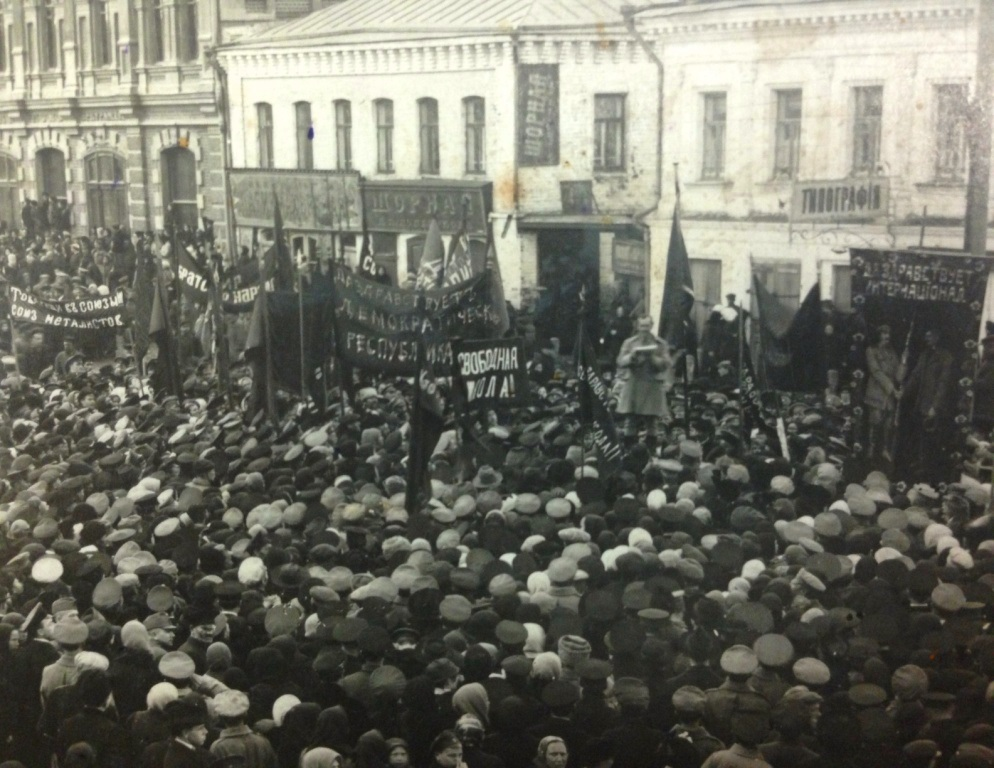
Miting on Georgievskaya Street (now Lenin Prospect) on March 15, 1917, following news of the February Revolution

On March 15, 1917, after Nicholas II's abdication, a large rally gathered in the city center. That evening, a decision was made to establish a Council of Workers' Deputies (later renamed the Council of Workers' and Soldiers' Deputies), comprising 55 representatives from various enterprises, eight from educational institutions, and 15 from the 199th Reserve Regiment stationed in the city. Simultaneously, the city duma deputies initiated the Committee of Public Safety (renamed the Committee of Public Organizations in May), declaring itself the sole authority in the city. The Committee included nearly all social strata and political forces, but was dominated by right-wing elements. Most Council deputies were non-partisan workers, but by late March, the Council came under Bolshevik control. Initially cooperative with the committee, the Council then shifted to confrontation, prioritizing political goals. This established a dual power situation, typical of Russia at the time. In early July, the Council unsuccessfully attempted to seize power by force. Realizing that control was impossible without the support of the local garrison, the Bolsheviks intensified propaganda among the 199th Regiment's soldiers. The Council organized trade unions for metalworkers, weavers, and printers, and factory committees through which Bolsheviks controlled production and distribution. On November 3, 1917, a major strike was organized in Ivanovo-Voznesensk and nearby cities under the leadership of M. V. Frunze and other Bolsheviks. On November 7, upon learning that power in Petrograd had passed to the Bolsheviks, the city Council, long prepared for this, formed a revolutionary headquarters with broad authority to maintain order. It took control of the telephone and telegraph systems and stationed armed guards throughout the city. Only postal workers and a small group of Mensheviks from the Council protested, but the postal strike was suppressed, and the Mensheviks' objections were ignored due to their lack of influence. Thus, power passed to the Bolsheviks in Ivanovo-Voznesensk without a single shot fired.

== Soviet period in Ivanovo ==
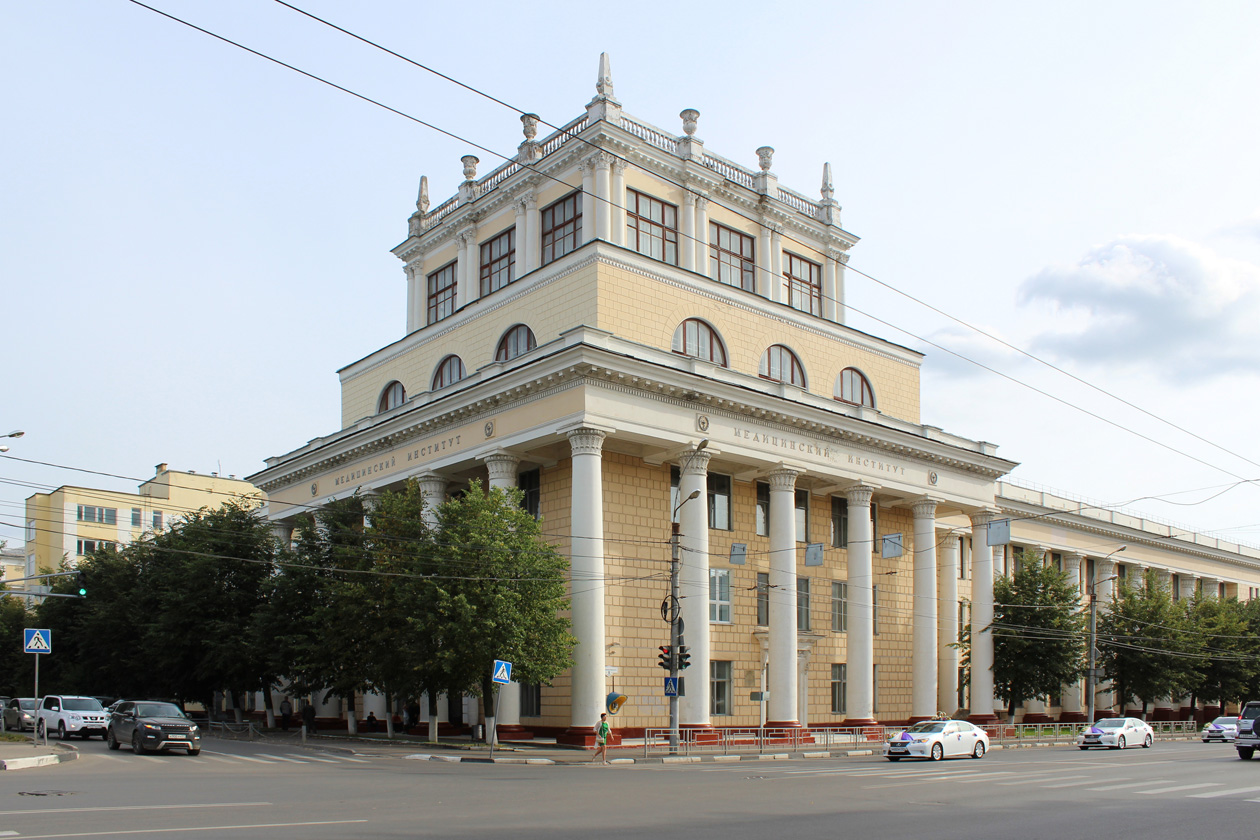
Building constructed in the 1930s–1950s for the medical institute (now ISMA)

Soon after, the political climate in the country shifted. Amid the intensification of Joseph Stalin's cult of personality and the campaign against the "Leninist Guard", L. M. Kaganovich visited Ivanovo in August 1937. At a plenary session of the Ivanovo Regional Committee of the All-Union Communist Party (Bolsheviks), he declared that the local party leadership consisted of "enemies of the people". This led to widespread repressions targeting Ivanovo's party officials, revolutionaries (including some members of the 1905 Council), economic managers, enterprise directors, workers, and intellectuals. Ivanovo ceased to be the center of the Ivanovo Industrial Region, and plans to fully redesign the city center were not realized. However, in the first two decades after 1917, the city's appearance had already changed significantly, and in terms of architectural monuments from this period, Ivanovo ranks second only to Moscow in the Central Federal District.

In 1940, new districts were annexed to the city: Balino, Voronnikovo, Lesnoye, Leninsky Put, Pritykino, Afanasovo, the settlement near the silicate brick factory, and the Park of the 1905 Revolution. The total area of the city reached 8,654 hectares.

In the fall of 1941, as the German army approached Moscow, preparations began to defend cities beyond the capital. On October 22, the City Defense Committee of Ivanovo was established. Shelters and fortifications were built in and around the city, anti-aircraft guns were installed, and approximately 50 hospitals were organized. The planned evacuation of factories and the dire material conditions of residents during the war led to worker protests at several enterprises. Ivanovo was largely spared from German air raids. (Note: German bombers flew over the region toward Gorky. According to some Ivanovo residents’ recollections, bombs fell on Ivanovo several times.) Several military units formed in Ivanovo fought on the fronts of the Great Patriotic War, including the 49th, 117th, 307th, and 332nd Rifle Divisions, which had distinguished combat records. In late 1942, the French fighter squadron Normandie-Niémen began its combat history in Ivanovo, consisting of pilots sent to the USSR by the Fighting France organization. The squadron was based at the Severny airfield. Ivanovo played a crucial role in supplying the army with textiles, as many textile enterprises in occupied territories and Leningrad had ceased operations. During the war, about 70,000 Ivanovo residents were sent to the front, of whom 27,000 did not return.

In 1947, the Gorino settlement was annexed to the city, and in the 1950s, the Dalny settlement, Avdotyino, Kuryanovo, Podyelnovo, and the village of Nikulikha were incorporated, with individual housing construction encouraged. By 1960, the allocation of new land for individual housing ceased. Post-war urban development resumed, with the Uvod River's channel deepened and widened in the historic center, and a dam built on the Talka River. In the 1950s, the Volga–Uvod Canal was constructed to improve the city's water supply, connecting to the Uvod Reservoir.

In 1951, Ivanovo's first general plan was adopted. Several valuable Constructivist buildings were remodeled to align with the changing stylistic trends of Soviet architecture. Barracks and dugouts were demolished, with the last dugout eliminated in 1952. The capacity of CHPP-1, built in the 1920s, became insufficient, leading to the commissioning of CHPP-2 in 1954. In 1955, the city began the process of gasification. In 1962, the trolleybus network was established.

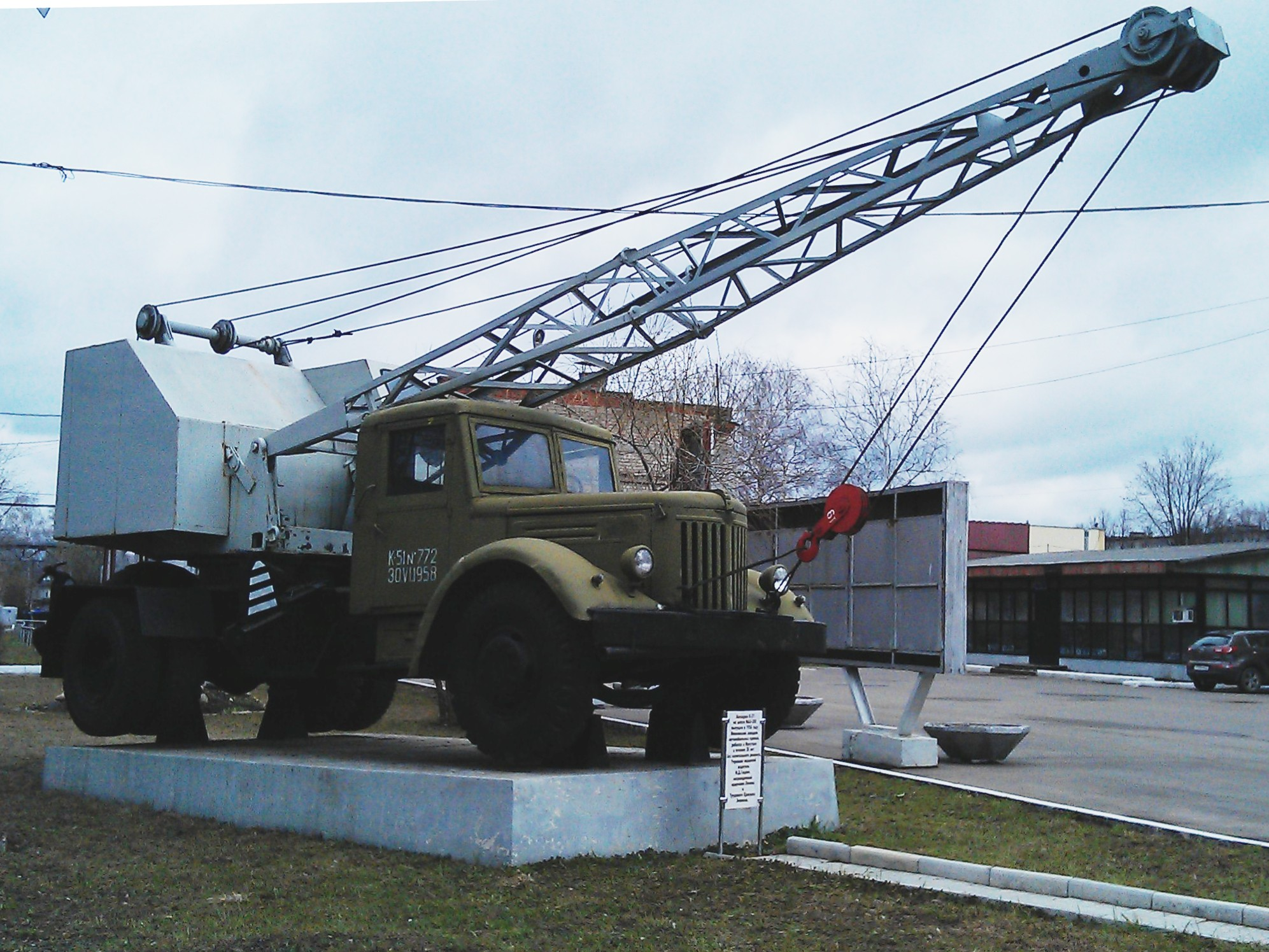
K-51 – the first model produced by the Crane Factory

By 1949, textile production had returned to pre-war levels. In the 1950s–1960s, the city's textile industry developed dynamically. In the early 1950s, many enterprises began producing staple fiber fabrics from synthetic fibers. In 1958, production of this material reached 177.5 km (110.3 mi). In 1963, the Worsted Mill opened, becoming a flagship of the region's textile industry, largely due to the efforts of the regional committee's first secretary, I. V. Kapitonov. The mill specialized in worsted fabrics for outerwear. Few sewing enterprises existed in Ivanovo, with clothing made from Ivanovo fabrics primarily produced in other regions. The post-war period highlighted a significant gender imbalance, as the textile industry had long employed mostly women, a disparity exacerbated by the war. To address this, several large machine-building enterprises were established to employ male labor, including the Crane Factory, Heavy Machine Tool Factory, Testing Instruments Factory, and Actuator Factory.

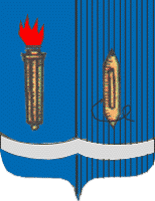
Coat of arms, 1970–1996

In the early 1960s, local authorities began actively promoting Ivanovo as the "birthplace of the first Soviet," although the mythologization of the 1905 events had started before World War II. The history of the council was significantly distorted. The Museum of the First Soviet was opened, and in 1980, a museum complex was established nearby. Ivanovo was included in the Golden Ring of Russia tourist route, standing out for its unique character among other cities. In the 1970s, many streets were renamed after revolutionary figures, and monuments with revolutionary themes were erected, including the Fighters of the Revolution Monument and the Red Talka Memorial. Not all of these monuments were successful. A panel on the facade of the House of Soviets featured a quote from V. I. Lenin, reflecting the city's significance in Soviet history: "...the Moscow, Petrograd, and Ivanovo-Voznesensk proletariat... proved in practice that it would not yield the gains of the revolution at any cost". (Note: The quote is from a speech by Lenin at the Third Congress of Textile Industry Workers on April 19, 1920: New hardships and tasks lie ahead, all the more difficult as more victories are won on the Red Front. Vast areas of Siberia and Ukraine have been liberated, where there is no proletariat like the Moscow, Petrograd, and Ivanovo-Voznesensk proletariat, which proved in practice that it would not yield the gains of the revolution at any cost.) During this period, rumors circulated about possibly renaming the city Pervosovetsk (First Soviet).

The city's revolutionary past and textile industry were reflected in Ivanovo's first coat of arms, adopted in 1970.

During the stagnation period, economic growth slowed across the country, with labor shortages felt in all sectors. Nevertheless, Ivanovo's industry continued to develop dynamically, maintaining its status as the country's primary textile center. Textile enterprises underwent extensive reconstruction, which was more cost-effective than building new factories. For instance, the Balashov and 8 March factories were transformed into automated plants with minimal manual labor. Modernization was largely driven by the regional committee's first secretary, V. G. Klyuev. The worsted mill and heavy machine tool factory achieved significant success, with their products supplied to nearly all Soviet republics and abroad. Weaver V. N. Golubeva from the worsted mill was twice awarded the title of Hero of Socialist Labor. Under the leadership of V. P. Kabaidze, the heavy machine tool factory began producing advanced numerically controlled machine tools with automatic tool changers, becoming a leader in Soviet machine tool manufacturing. In 1970, the city was awarded the Order of the October Revolution.

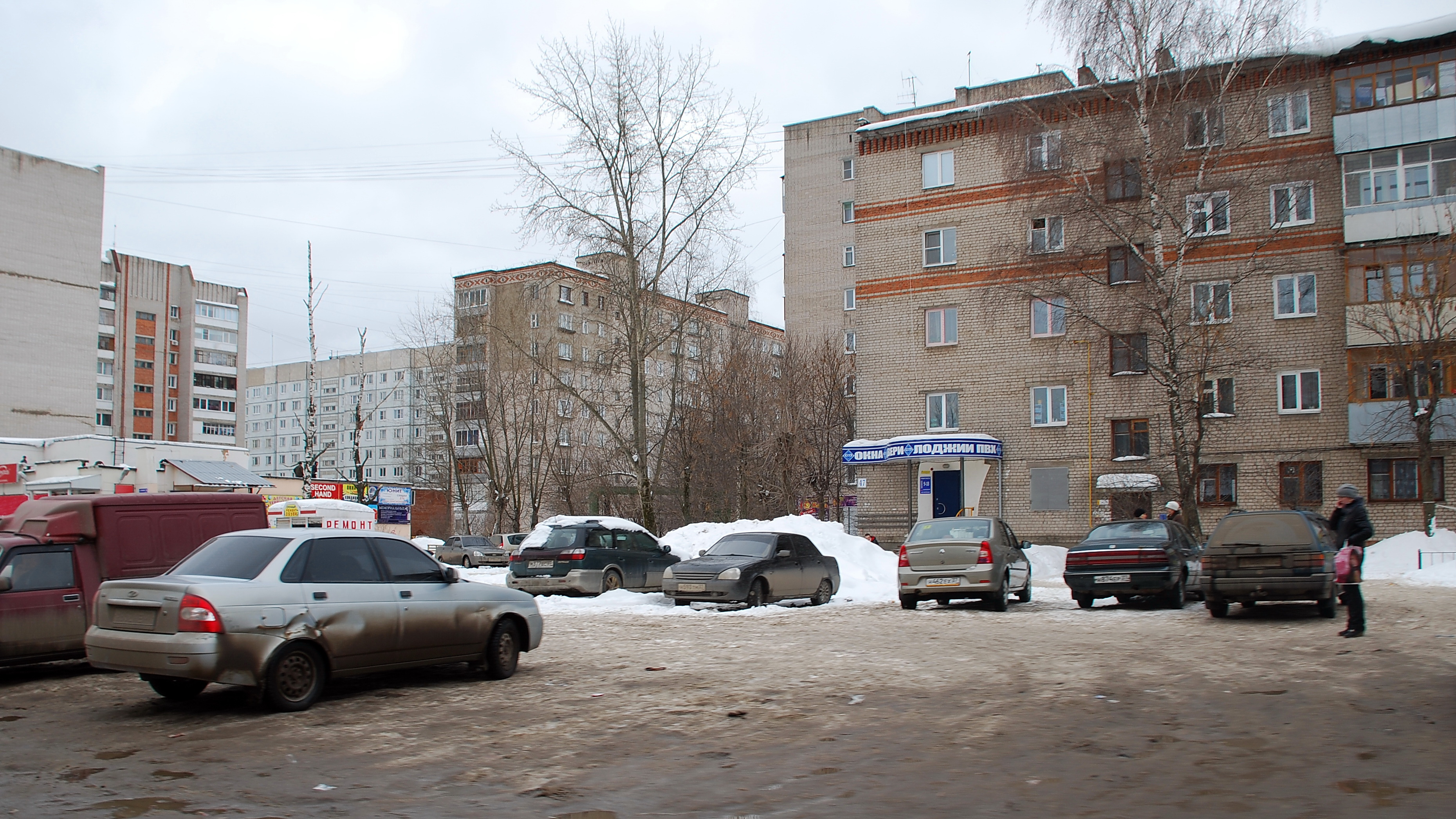
Velizhskaya Street. Construction from the 1960s–1990s.

In 1968, a new general plan for Ivanovo was adopted, envisioning the reconstruction of the city center with multi-level interchanges and the demolition of old buildings. The main areas for high-rise residential construction were the southern and southeastern outskirts. It was anticipated that Ivanovo would eventually merge with Kokhma. In 1970, the city's area was 97 km^{2} (37 sq mi), with a population of 420,000. In 1974, the territory of CHPP-3 and its residential district were incorporated into the city, and in 1981, lands near Sukhovka village were added, soon developed into the Sukhovo-Deryabikhsky district. By 1982, Ivanovo's population reached 471,000 across an area exceeding 100 km^{2} (39 sq mi). The 1986 general plan shifted focus to preserving the historic city center.

In 1982, after airport reconstruction, Ivanovo's air connections expanded, with Tu-134 and An-24 flights serving 12 regional destinations and 44 major Soviet cities.

In 1948, the city had 52 general education schools, 12 factory schools, 19 technical colleges, and six universities. The renowned mathematician and academician A. I. Maltsev worked in Ivanovo. Between 1946 and 1961, 15 new school buildings were constructed. In 1960, 14,500 students were enrolled in universities, increasing to 24,000 by 1970. The largest institutions were the power engineering, chemical-technological, and textile universities. In the 1970s, the Ivanovo State Pedagogical Institute expanded with new faculties and became Ivanovo State University, and in 1981, the construction faculty of the power engineering institute was reorganized into the Institute of Civil Engineering.

In 1960, Ivanovo had 361 stores. By 1970, this number grew to 413, and a covered market opened on Bogdan Khmelnitsky Street.

In 1947, a balneological clinic was opened at the Sosnevsky mineral water source. In the 1950s, several new city and children's hospitals were established. Later, many enterprises introduced sanatoriums for workers' health. In 1971, the first building of the regional clinical hospital was opened on the city's outskirts, and in 1980, the Research Institute of Motherhood and Childhood was established. Ivanovo's medical professionals acted swiftly during the aftermath of the tornado that struck the city's western outskirts on June 9, 1984.

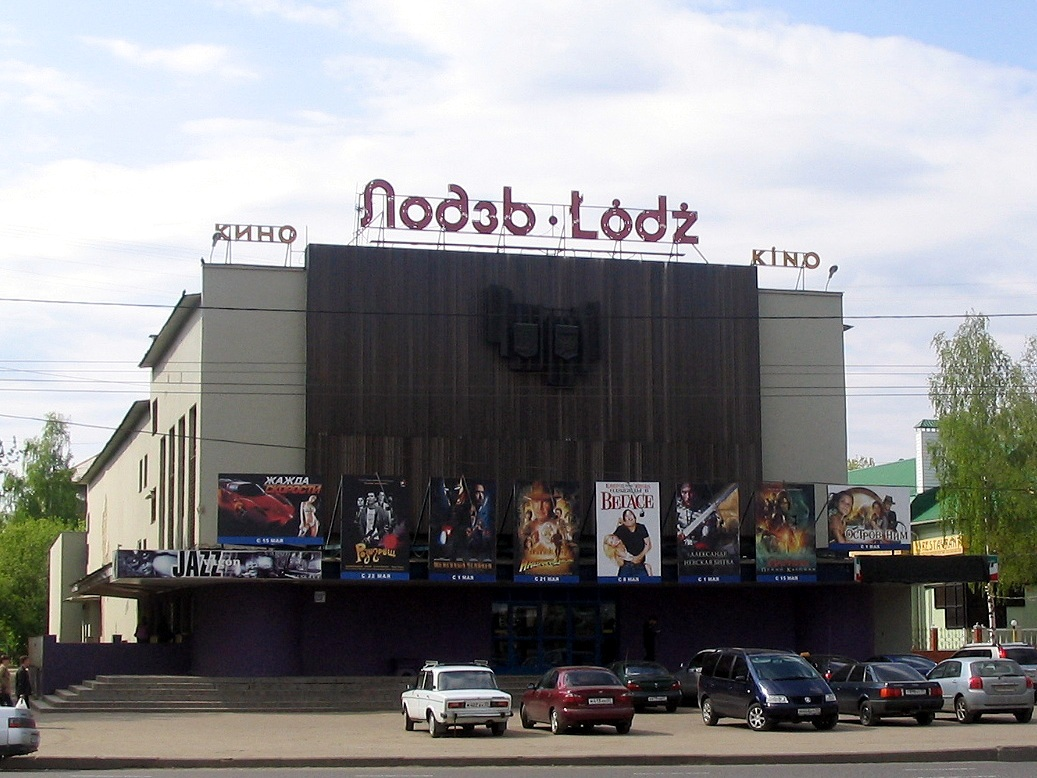
Cinema Lodz, named after the Polish sister city

In 1943, the Composers' House of Creativity was opened near the city on the banks of the Kharinka River, where prominent Soviet composers worked during the war. In the 1950s–1960s, six new cinemas were opened, and Ivanovo's theatrical life was vibrant. In 1960, the art gallery was transformed into the Ivanovo Regional Art Museum. In 1958, a television retransmission tower was built in Khutorovo.

In 1987, the multi-year reconstruction of the theater complex was completed. L. V. Raskatov, the region's first People's Artist, performed there. Ballet in Ivanovo became an independent art form after the arrival of V. E. Lisovskaya, who became the chief choreographer of the Musical Theater. Other significant cultural events included a semi-private screening of A. A. Tarkovsky's film Mirror and an exhibition of paintings by I. S. Glazunov. In 1975, Ivanovo hosted the Red Carnation arts festival, which became a tradition. The local musical group Meridian gained nationwide fame.

In 1989, only one Orthodox church was operational in Ivanovo. A group of women believers staged a hunger strike on the steps of the Vvedensky Church, then housing the regional archive, demanding the resumption of religious services. Their banner read: "We neither eat nor drink until the Red Church is reopened and are ready to die in the birthplace of the first Soviets". The protest, which drew attention from Soviet and international media, resulted in the building's return to the church. In 1991, the Vvedensky Women's Monastery was established there.

During the August Coup, the regional and city party committees in Ivanovo were largely inactive. On August 19, opponents of the State Committee on the State of Emergency (GKChP) held a rally on Smirnov Street. Soon after, the regional and city committees were closed. For a time, the editorial office of the newspaper Rabochy Kray, the region's oldest and main Soviet-era publication, was sealed, as its editor at the time supported the GKChP.

== Post-Soviet period ==
Coat of arms since 1996

During Russia's transition to a market economy, Ivanovo's industry entered a period of crisis. Problems began during Perestroika, but after the collapse of the USSR, the situation worsened significantly. Economic ties with Central Asian republics supplying cotton were severed. By the early 1990s, most Ivanovo factories had been repurposed to produce goods for the Ministry of Defense and workwear, but the military failed to pay for orders. This left factories unable to transition to consumer goods production, contributing to industrial stagnation. The city's economic potential collapsed, unemployment surged, and workers' protests erupted. In 1996, major factories in the city and region formed the "Russian Textile" financial-industrial group to consolidate capital for industrial investment. Red directors frequently sought aid from the regional government, but multimillion-ruble loans only temporarily revived production, with enterprises shifting to low-cost fabrics. From 1996 to 1998, Ivanovo's airport ceased operations due to insufficient funding.

In 1996, the city adopted a new coat of arms, later criticized for historical inaccuracies, and held its first mayoral election, won by V. V. Troeglazov. In 2000, A. V. Groshev became mayor, ending rolling blackouts initiated under Troeglazov. However, his approval rating remained low due to issues with hot water supply in spring and summer, unmaintained streets, non-operational evening transport, and bankruptcies of municipal enterprises.

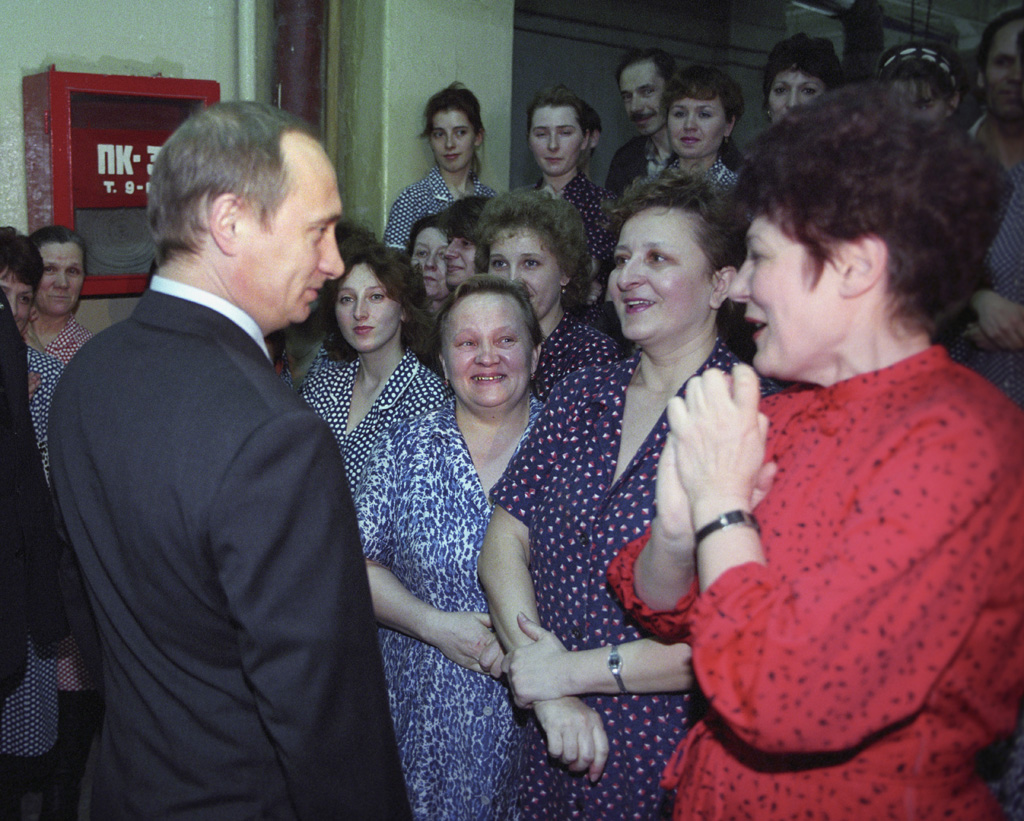
V. V. Putin with workers of the New Ivanovo Manufactory, 2000

In the 1990s, the toll manufacturing scheme became widespread in Ivanovo, as in Russia overall. Entrepreneurs controlling raw material markets and product distribution (so-called "tollers") supplied cotton to factories and took finished products, reaping the main profits. By the decade's end, new managers, many former tollers, replaced red directors, leading to a slight revival in the textile industry. However, stagnation resumed in the early 2000s. Many experts attribute the decline of Ivanovo's textile industry to tolling and shortsighted new entrepreneurs. Near-bankrupt factories lost competitiveness against products from countries with cheap labor (China, India, Turkey, Pakistan). Most factories ceased operations, though some continue with outdated equipment and low production volumes. Machine-building enterprises also faced difficulties.

A major air disaster occurred near Ivanovo in 1992: a Tu-134 passenger plane crashed on approach, killing 84 people. Since 1993, the 98th Guards Airborne Division has been stationed in Ivanovo, and since 1998, A-50 AEW&C aircraft have been based at Severny airfield.

Some sectors, such as the sewing industry and wholesale-retail textile trade, thrived in the early 21st century. Ivanovo's textile shopping centers ("RIO," "Textile Profi-Ivanovo," etc.) attract buyers from many Central Russian regions. Former factory buildings now house office and shopping centers, with some used as warehouses and others standing vacant. The largest shopping centers, "Euroland" and "Silver City," opened in the former worsted mill and the 8th March automated weaving factory, respectively.

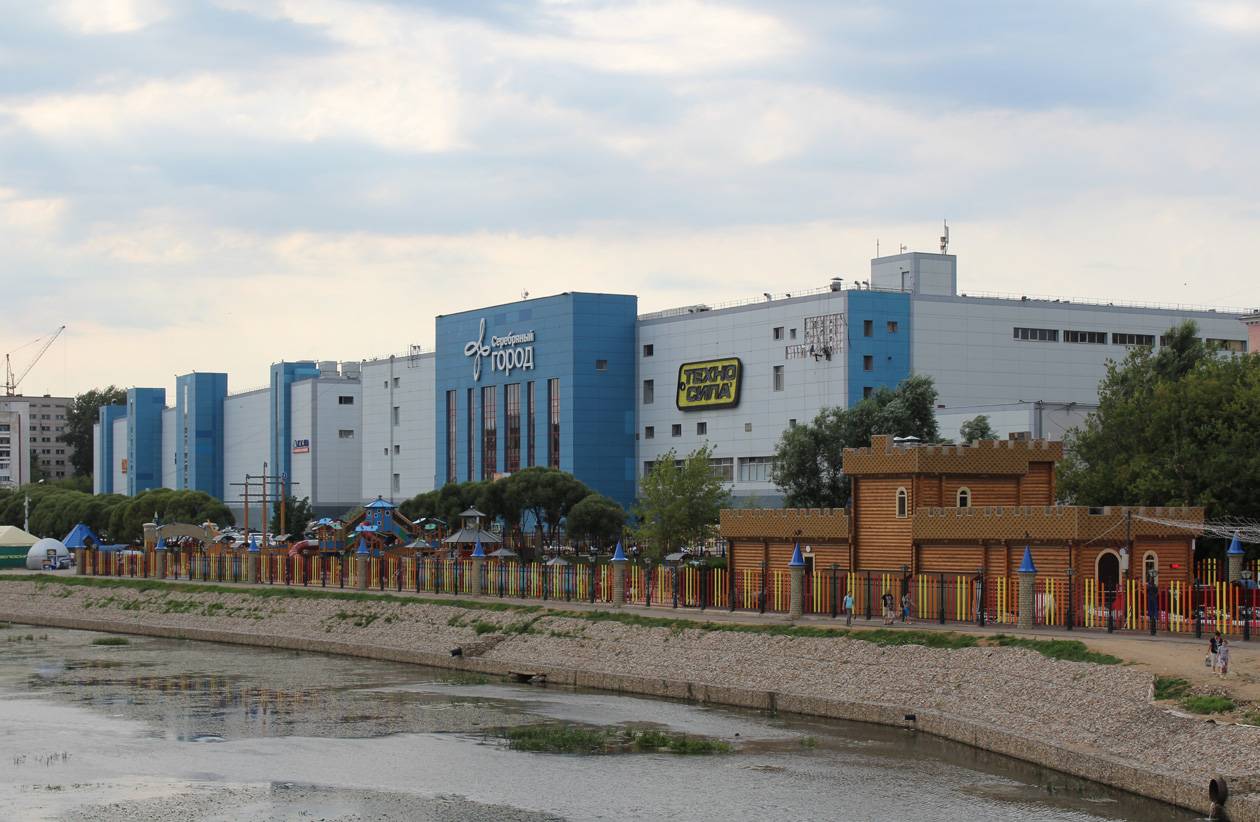
"Silver City" shopping and entertainment center on the Uvod River bank. Opened in 2002 in the former 8th March automated weaving factory.

In 2005, the last direct mayoral election was held, won by A. G. Fomin, who served for five years. He established a cohesive city management system, linking administrative units and municipal enterprises. His tenure coincided with M. A. Men's appointment as regional governor and Russia's economic upturn, with Ivanovo receiving substantial federal subsidies and Moscow investments. In 2006, a new general plan was adopted for the period up to 2025, updating the largely unimplemented 1986 plan. Moscow investments funded the Moskovsky microdistrict. With Moscow's financial support, the airport was reconstructed and resumed operations. In 2007, the Union of Cities of Central and Northwestern Russia recognized Ivanovo among the top five for implementing national projects and a leader in housing construction growth in the Central Federal District. However, Ivanovo lagged in road pavement quality. In 2008, the tram network was fully discontinued.

In 1994, the Ivanovo Zoo was established based on a young naturalists' club. In 2007, the international film festival Zerkalo began. In 2012, construction started on the Palace of Team Sports, which became the home arena for Energia, a women's basketball club that competed in the Russian Women's Basketball Premier League multiple times in the 2000s. In 2015, a fire destroyed the wooden Assumption Church.

The campaign to restore historical names largely bypassed Ivanovo. However, since the early 1990s, proposals to revert the city's name to Ivanovo-Voznesensk have periodically emerged. Polls indicate most residents oppose this.

== Bibliography ==
- Averin, V.A. (2012). "Археологические памятники на территории г. Иваново" [Archaeological monuments in the city of Ivanovo]. Археология Ивановской области: учебное пособие [Archaeology of Ivanovo Oblast: a textbook] (PDF). Ivanovo: Yepisheva O. V. pp. 66–67. Archived from the original (PDF) on October 23, 2021.
- Averin, V.A.; Averina, A.V.; Utkin, A.V. (2012). "Мезолитические роговые муфты с территории Верхнего Поволжья" [Mesolithic horn sleeves from the Upper Volga region]. Rossiyskaya Arkheologiya (1).
- Baldin, K. E.; Semenenko, A. A. (2011). История Ивановской области [History of Ivanovo Oblast]. p. 4.
- Eksempliarsky (1958). История Иваново [History of Ivanovo]. p. 12.
- Garelin, Y. P. (1884). Город Иваново [The city of Ivanovo]. p. 131.
- Khudyakov, N. B.; Baldin, K. E.; Travkin, P. N. (2007). Историко-географический атлас Ивановской области [Historical-geographical atlas of Ivanovo Oblast]. Ivanovo: Upper Volga Aerogeodetic Enterprise. p. 36.
- Orlov, D. L. "Предметы периода Смутного времени из коллекций Д.Г.Бурылина в собрании Ивановского государственного историко-краеведческого музея имени Д.Г.Бурылина" [Items from the Time of Troubles in the collections of D.G. Burylin at the Ivanovo State Historical and Local History Museum named after D.G. Burylin]. Ivanovo State Historical and Local History Museum named after D. G. Burylin.
- Prokurorov F. E., Bochkov M. V. (1981). Имена улиц города Иваново [Names of Ivanovo streets] (in Russian). Ив.: Редакционно-издательский отдел упрполиграфиздата Ивановского облисполкома. p. 136.
- Semenenko, A. M. (2016). "Когда появилось Иваново" [When did Ivanovo appear]. 1000 Ekz. 4 (117). Archived from the original on October 26, 2021.
- Semenenko, A. M. (2011). "Откуда есть пошло Иваново…" [Whence came Ivanovo…]. История Иваново [History of Ivanovo].
- Semenenko, A. M. (2016). "Забытые вотчинники села Иванова князья Скопины-Шуйские" [Forgotten patrons of the village of Ivanovo, the Skopin-Shuysky princes]. 1000 Ekz. (123). Archived from the original on January 18, 2017.
- Shlychkov, L. A. (1998). "О начале Иванова" [On the origins of Ivanovo]. Леонид Шлычков: личность, творчество, жизнь. Сборник материалов [Leonid Shlychkov: personality, creativity, life. Collection of materials]. Ivanovo: Шлычков Л.А. pp. 7–12.
- Tikhomirov (2011). История города Иванова [History of the city of Ivanovo]. p. 328.
- Tikhomirov (2022). История города Иванова [History of the city of Ivanovo]. p. 480.
- Tyumentsev, I. O.; Tupikova, N. A.; Rybalko, N. V. (2009). "Письма наемников, отписки и сыскные дела воевод, челобитные жителей Суздаля из русского архива Яна Сапеги" [Letters of mercenaries, reports and investigations of voivodes, petitions of Suzdal residents from the Russian archive of Jan Sapieha]. Vestnik Volgogradskogo Gosudarstvennogo Universiteta. Seria 4: Istoriya. Regionovedenie. Mezhdunarodnye otnosheniya (2).
- Zhmurko, O. I. "Некоторые факты из истории ивановских говоров" [Some facts from the history of Ivanovo dialects].
