= Shuysky Uyezd =

Subdivision of Vladimir Governate, Russian Empire

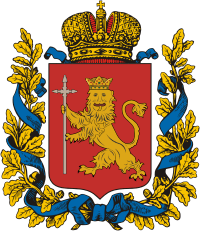
Vladimir Governorate (Russian empire), coat of arms

Shuysky Uyezd (Шуйский уезд) was one of the subdivisions of the Vladimir Governorate of the Russian Empire. It was situated in the northern part of the governorate. Its administrative centre was Shuya.

== Demographics ==
At the time of the Russian Empire Census of 1897, Shuysky Uyezd had a population of 158,483. Of these, 99.6% spoke Russian, 0.1% Yiddish, 0.1% German, 0.1% Tatar and 0.1% Polish as their native language.
