= Ivanovo constituency =

Ivanovo single-member constituency
- Constituency of the Russian State Duma

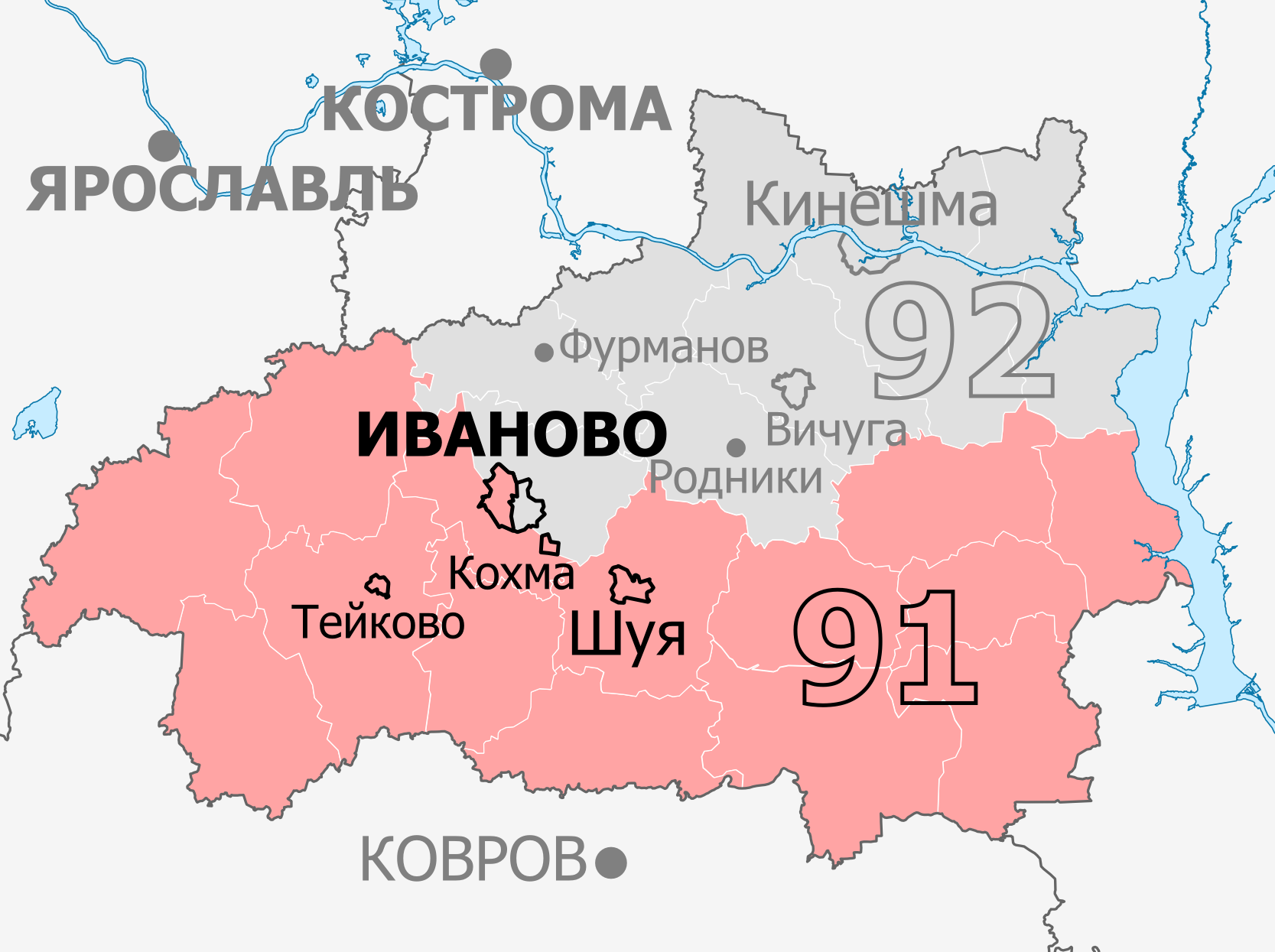
- Constituency boundaries from 2016 to 2026
- Deputy: Vitaly Drozdov; United Russia
- Federal subject: Ivanovo Oblast
- Districts: Furmanovsky, Gavrilovo-Posadsky, Ilyinsky, Ivanovo, Ivanovsky, Kineshma, Kineshemsky, Kokhma, Komsomolsky, Lukhsky, Lezhnevsky, Palekhsky, Pestyakovsky, Privolzhsky, Puchezhsky, Rodnikovsky, Savinsky, Shuya, Shuysky, Teykovo, Teykovsky, Verkhnelandekhovsky, Vichuga, Vichugsky,Yuryevetsky, Yuzhsky, Zavolzhsky
- Voters: 747,281 (2026)

The Ivanovo constituency (No.94 (Note: No.79 in 1993-1995, No.78 in 1995-2003, No.80 in 2003-2007, No.91 in 2016–2026)) is a Russian legislative constituency in Ivanovo Oblast. The constituency covers the entire territory of Ivanovo Oblast.

The constituency has been represented since 2026 by United Russia deputy Vitaly Drozdov, former Rostelekom vice president and retired Russian Army guards podpolkovnik, who won the open seat, succeeding one-term United Russia incumbents Viktor Smirnov and Mikhail Kizeyev.

== Boundaries ==
1993–2007: Gavrilovo-Posadsky District, Ilyinsky District, Ivanovo, Ivanovsky District, Kokhma, Komsomolsky District, Teykovo, Teykovsky District
The constituency covered oblast capital Ivanovo, its suburbs and western Ivanovo Oblast, including the textile industrial city Teykovo.

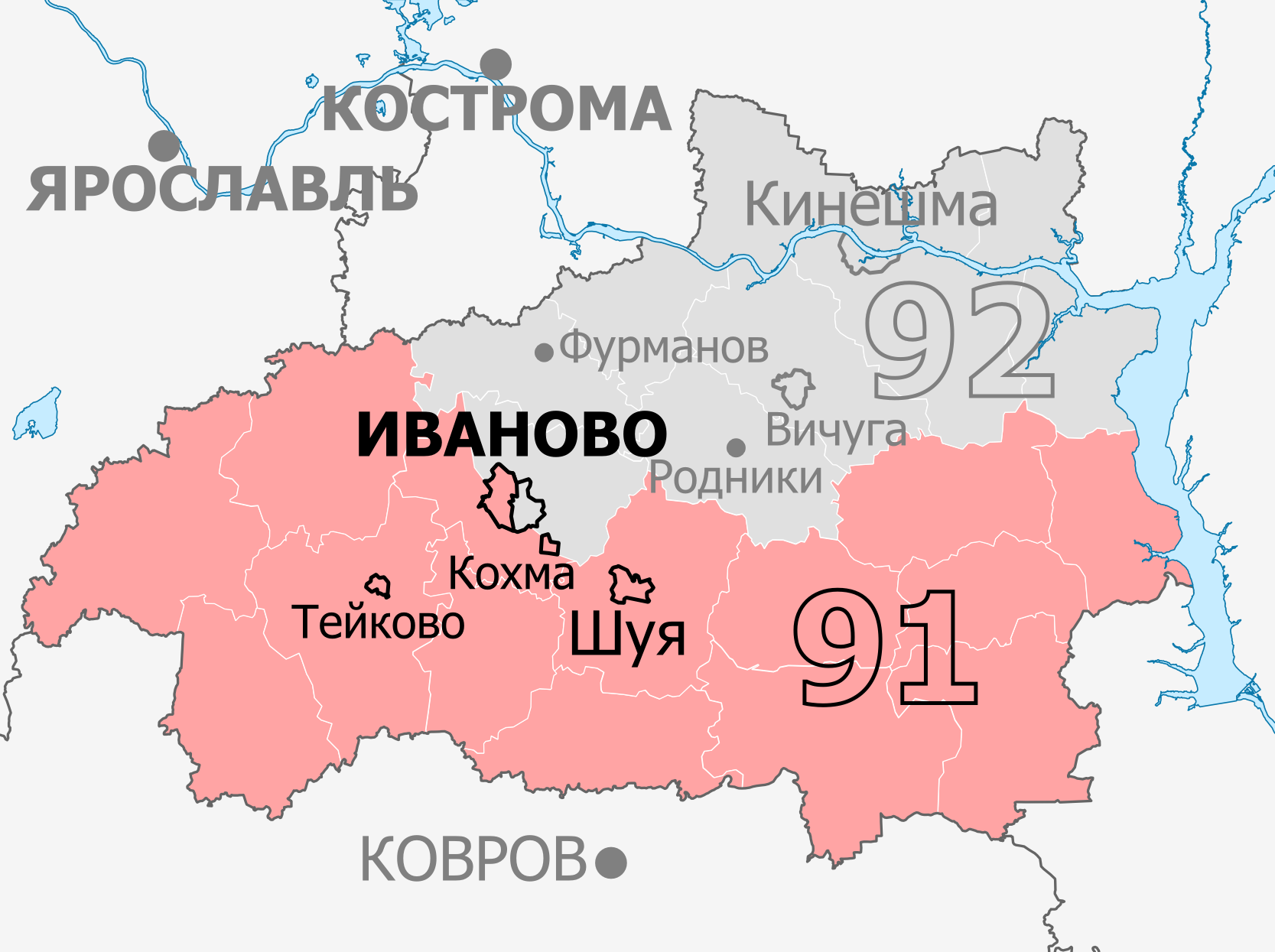
Constituency boundaries from 2016 to 2026

2016–2026: Gavrilovo-Posadsky District, Ilyinsky District, Ivanovo (Frunzensky, Oktyabrsky), Ivanovsky District (Balakhonkovskoye, Belyanitskoye, Bogdanikhskoye, Chernorechenskoye, Kolyanovskoye, Novotalitskoye), Kokhma, Komsomolsky District, Lukhsky District, Lezhnevsky District, Palekhsky District, Pestyakovsky District, Puchezhsky District, Savinsky District, Shuya, Shuysky District, Teykovo, Teykovsky District, Verkhnelandekhovsky District, Yuzhsky District
The constituency was re-created for the 2016 election and retained almost all of its former territory, losing eastern half of Ivanovo and its suburbs to Kineshma constituency. This seat instead gained rural southern Ivanovo Oblast, including the city of Shuya, from Kineshma constituency.

2026–present: Furmanovsky District, Gavrilovo-Posadsky District, Ilyinsky District, Ivanovo, Ivanovsky District, Kineshma, Kineshemsky District, Kokhma, Komsomolsky District, Lukhsky District, Lezhnevsky District, Palekhsky District, Pestyakovsky District, Privolzhsky District, Puchezhsky District, Rodnikovsky District, Savinsky District, Shuya, Shuysky District, Teykovo, Teykovsky District, Verkhnelandekhovsky District, Vichuga, Vichugsky District, Yuryevetsky District, Yuzhsky District, Zavolzhsky District
After the 2025 redistricting Ivanovo Oblast lost one of its two constituencies, so both Ivanovo and Kineshma constituencies were merged into a single constituency, covering the entirety of Ivanovo Oblast.

== Members elected ==
Election	Member	Party
1993	Viktor Zelyonkin	Choice of Russia
1995	Vladimir Laritsky	Independent
1999	Tatyana Yakovleva	Unity
2003	Tatyana Yakovleva	United Russia
2007	Proportional representation - no election by constituency	
2011	Proportional representation - no election by constituency	
2016	Aleksey Khokhlov	United Russia
2021	Viktor Smirnov	United Russia
2026	Vitaly Drozdov	United Russia

== Election results ==
=== 1993 ===
Summary of the 12 December 1993 Russian legislative election in the Ivanovo constituency
Candidate	Party	Votes	%
Viktor Zelyonkin	Choice of Russia	81,719	31.05%
Andrey Melnikov	Independent	35,172	13.36%
Vladimir Podzhivotov	Independent	33,407	12.69%
Sergey Zimin	Party of Russian Unity and Accord	19,876	7.55%
Valery Fedotov	Russian Democratic Reform Movement	13,038	4.95%
against all		57,851	21.98%
Total		263,191	100%

=== 1995 ===
Summary of the 17 December 1995 Russian legislative election in the Ivanovo constituency
Candidate	Party	Votes	%
Vladimir Laritsky	Independent	64,394	20.11%
Valentin Bakulin	Communist Party	41,425	12.94%
Pavel Shapovalov	Liberal Democratic Party	33,341	10.41%
Valery Troyeglazov	Independent	28,367	8.86%
Sergey Zimin	Our Home – Russia	27,701	8.65%
Viktor Zelyonkin (incumbent)	Democratic Choice of Russia – United Democrats	27,045	8.45%
Boris Bolshakov	Independent	15,321	4.78%
Aleksandr Budanov	Yabloko	12,642	3.95%
Galina Dushina	Block of Djuna	9,247	2.89%
Sergey Repyakhov	Congress of Russian Communities	7,005	2.19%
Sergey Padylin	Independent	6,781	2.12%
Aleksandr Zorkin	Independent	4,533	1.42%
Feliks Sanakoyev	My Fatherland	2,056	0.64%
Vladimir Kotin	Ivan Rybkin Bloc	1,613	0.50%
Igor Dementyev	Independent	1,121	0.35%
against all		30,973	9.67%
Total		320,195	100%

=== 1999 ===
Summary of the 19 December 1999 Russian legislative election in the Ivanovo constituency
Candidate	Party	Votes	%
Tatyana Yakovleva	Unity	63,174	20.91%
Ivan Pimenov	Independent	43,441	14.38%
Vasily Duma	Independent	28,665	9.49%
Valery Bobylev	Independent	23,870	7.90%
Sergey Sirotkin	Liberal Democratic Party	17,858	5.91%
Pavel Pozhigaylo	Fatherland – All Russia	16,605	5.50%
Andrey Serov	Independent	12,870	4.26%
Andrey Kabelev	Independent	11,894	3.94%
Sergey Repyakhov	Independent	9,984	3.30%
Nikolay Filin	Yabloko	8,087	2.68%
Boris Mints	Independent	7,488	2.48%
Vyacheslav Kulikov	Independent	5,663	1.87%
Yury Chayka	Russian All-People's Union	4,206	1.39%
Aleksandr Mirskoy	Andrey Nikolayev and Svyatoslav Fyodorov Bloc	3,291	1.09%
Valentina Gubernatorova	Kedr	3,247	1.07%
Sergey Zimin	Our Home – Russia	2,496	0.83%
Aleksandr Balashov	Spiritual Heritage	1,383	0.46%
Sergey Grigoryev	Independent	857	0.28%
Vladimir Kotin	Russian Socialist Party	632	0.21%
against all		31,341	10.37%
Total		302,107	100%

=== 2003 ===
Summary of the 7 December 2003 Russian legislative election in the Ivanovo constituency
Candidate	Party	Votes	%
Tatyana Yakovleva (incumbent)	United Russia	73,063	30.46%
Galina Kuzmina	Communist Party	25,746	10.73%
Sergey Kolesov	Union of Right Forces	25,490	10.63%
Valery Troyeglazov	Party of Russia's Rebirth-Russian Party of Life	24,479	10.21%
Sergey Sirotkin	Liberal Democratic Party	22,718	9.47%
Viktor Pavlov	Independent	11,068	4.61%
Vladimir Cherkashov	Independent	9,207	3.84%
Nasib Kurbanov	Agrarian Party	5,657	2.36%
Leonid Belyayev	Great Russia – Eurasian Union	2,409	1.00%
against all		36,624	15.27%
Total		240,105	100%

=== 2016 ===
Summary of the 18 September 2016 Russian legislative election in the Ivanovo constituency
Candidate	Party	Votes	%
Aleksey Khokhlov	United Russia	68,291	41.06%
Dmitry Salomatin	Communist Party	28,974	17.42%
Dmitry Shelyakin	Liberal Democratic Party	23,874	14.35%
Pavel Popov	A Just Russia	12,899	7.75%
Aleksandr Orekhov	Communists of Russia	7,180	4.32%
Olga Daricheva	The Greens	6,383	3.84%
Danila Belyayev	Yabloko	4,776	2.87%
Vyacheslav Kalinin	Rodina	3,618	2.18%
Vladimir Kurin	Patriots of Russia	2,617	1.57%
Roman Astafyev	Civic Platform	2,451	1.47%
Total		166,338	100%

=== 2021 ===
Summary of the 17-19 September 2021 Russian legislative election in the Ivanovo constituency
Candidate	Party	Votes	%
Viktor Smirnov	United Russia	62,009	38.96%
Svetlana Protasevich	Communist Party	36,756	23.10%
Sergey Klyuyev	Liberal Democratic Party	13,864	8.71%
Sergey Shestukhin	A Just Russia — For Truth	13,729	8.63%
Valery Boyarkov	Party of Pensioners	8,684	5.46%
Sharaf Ibragimov	New People	5,353	3.36%
Rushan Taktarov	Communists of Russia	3,618	2.27%
Aleksey Ananyev	Rodina	3,409	2.14%
Andrey Avtoneyev	Yabloko	2,981	1.87%
Vladimir Khudyakov	The Greens	2,694	1.69%
Total		159,142	100%

=== 2026 ===
Summary of the 18-20 September 2026 Russian legislative election in the Ivanovo constituency
Candidate	Party	Votes	%
Vitaly Drozdov	United Russia	246,240	58.88%
Aleksandr Boykov	Communist Party	69,524	16.62%
Dmitry Shelyakin	Liberal Democratic Party	39,183	9.37%
Nikita Yemelin	New People	25,937	6.20%
Anton Abramychev	Communists of Russia	15,507	3.71%
Konstantin Durasov	A Just Russia	14,142	3.38%
Total		418,214	100%
