= Kineshma constituency =

Kineshma single-member constituency
- Constituency of the Russian State Duma

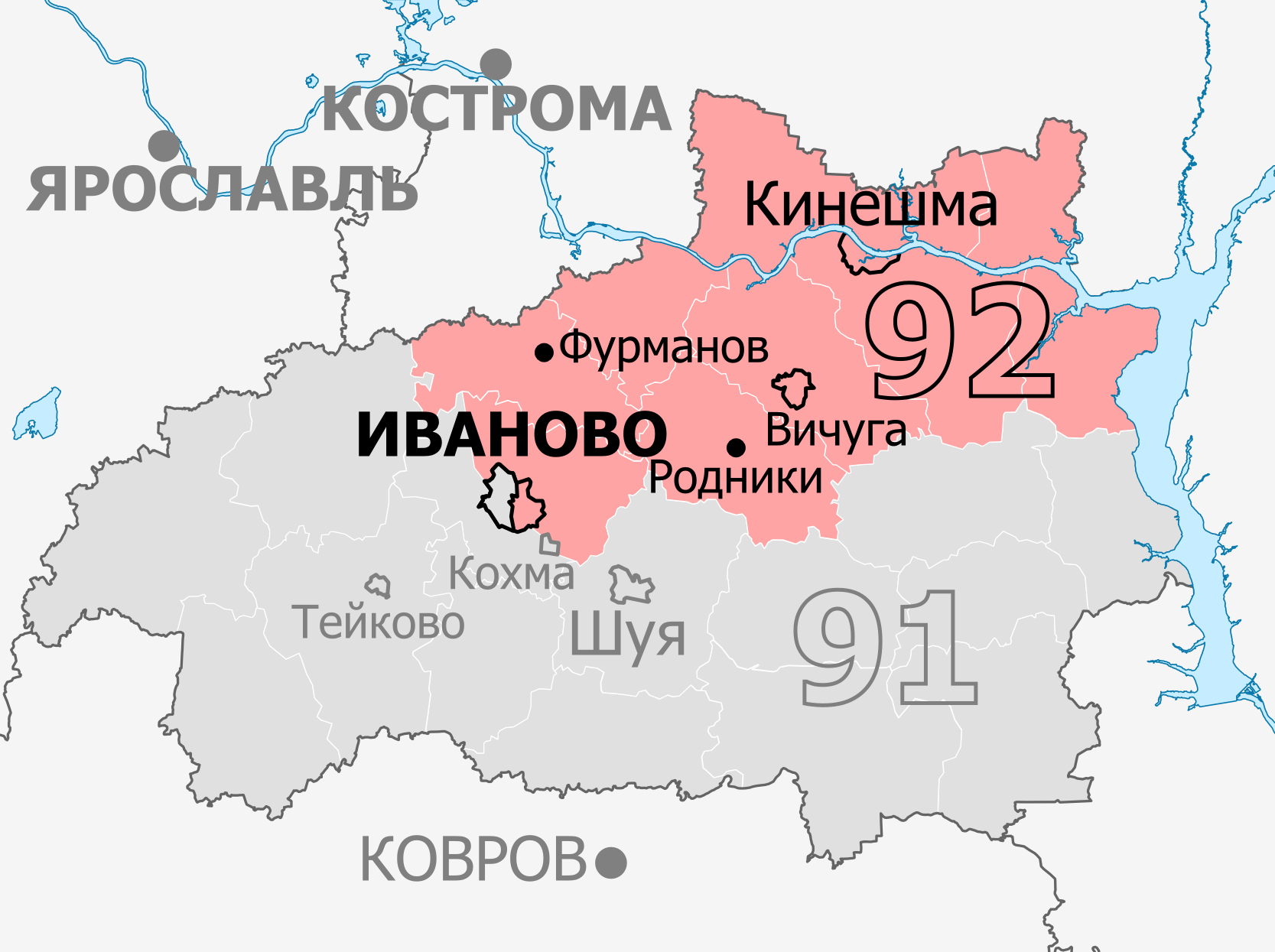
- Constituency boundaries from 2016 to 2026
- Deputy: None
- Federal subject: Ivanovo Oblast
- Districts: Furmanovsky, Ivanovo (Leninsky, Sovetsky), Ivanovsky (Bogorodskoye, Kulikovskoye, Ozernovskoye, Podvyaznovskoye, Timoshokhskoye), Kineshma, Kineshemsky, Privolzhsky, Rodnikovsky, Vichuga, Vichugsky, Yuryevetsky, Zavolzhsky
- Other territory: Belgium, Czech Republic, Georgia, Italy
- Voters: 400,688 (2021)

The Kineshma constituency (No.92 (Note: No.80 in 1993-1995, No.79 in 1995-2003, No.81 in 2003-2007)) was a Russian legislative constituency in Ivanovo Oblast in 1993–2007 and 2016–2026. The constituency covered eastern half of Ivanovo and northern Ivanovo Oblast. After 2025 redistricting Ivanovo Oblast lost one of its two constituencies, so Kineshma constituency was dissolved and merged with Ivanovo constituency.

The constituency was last represented by United Russia deputy Mikhail Kizeyev, former Member of Ivanovo Oblast Duma and ophthalmologist, who won the open seat in 2021, succeeding one-term United Russia incumbent Yury Smirnov. Kizeyev did not seek re-election in 2026.

== Boundaries ==
1993–1995: Furmanov, Kineshemsky District, Kineshma, Lezhnevsky District, Lukhsky District, Palekhsky District, Pestyakovsky District, Privolzhsky District, Puchezhsky District, Rodnikovsky District, Savinsky District, Shuya, Shuysky District, Sokolsky District, Verkhnelandekhovsky District, Vichuga, Vichugsky District, Yuryevetsky District, Yuzhsky District, Zavolzhsky District
The constituency covered rural central and eastern Ivanovo Oblast, including the cities of Furmanov, Kineshma, Shuya and Vichuga.

1995–2007: Furmanov, Kineshemsky District, Kineshma, Lezhnevsky District, Lukhsky District, Palekhsky District, Pestyakovsky District, Privolzhsky District, Puchezhsky District, Rodnikovsky District, Savinsky District, Shuya, Shuysky District, Verkhnelandekhovsky District, Vichuga, Vichugsky District, Yuryevetsky District, Yuzhsky District, Zavolzhsky District
The constituency lost Sokolsky District in its far east, which was transferred from Ivanovo Oblast to Nizhny Novgorod Oblast in 1994.

2016–2026: Furmanovsky, Ivanovo (Leninsky, Sovetsky), Ivanovsky (Bogorodskoye, Kulikovskoye, Ozernovskoye, Podvyaznovskoye, Timoshikhskoye), Kineshemsky, Kineshma, Privolzhsky, Rodnikovsky, Vichuga, Vichugsky, Yuryevetsky, Zavolzhsky
The constituency was re-created for the 2016 election and retained its northern half, losing the rest to Ivanovo constituency. This seat instead stretched westwards, gaining eastern Ivanovo and its suburbs from Ivanovo constituency.

== Members elected ==
Election	Member	Party
1993	Sergey Zenkin	Civic Union
1995	Vladimir Tikhonov (Note: elected Governor of Ivanovo Oblast in December 2000)	Communist Party
1999	Vladimir Tikhonov	Communist Party
2001	Valentina Krutova	Independent
2003	Mikhail Babich	United Russia
2007	Proportional representation - no election by constituency	
2011	Proportional representation - no election by constituency	
2016	Yury Smirnov	United Russia
2021	Mikhail Kizeyev	United Russia

== Election results ==
=== 1993 ===
==== Declared candidates ====
- Dmitry Belov (PRES), business association director
- Aleksandr Lyubovskikh (LDPR), Yaroslavl Oblast administration official
- Valery Lyutarevich (RDDR), businessman
- Nikolay Spanovsky (DPR), attorney
- Sergey Zenkin (Civic Union), former Member of Ivanovo Oblast Council of People's Deputies (1990–1993)
- Nadezhda Zotina (Independent), middle school principal

==== Withdrawn candidates ====
- Iren Andreyeva (Choice of Russia), former People's Deputy of the Soviet Union (1989–1991)

==== Results ====
Summary of the 12 December 1993 Russian legislative election in the Kineshma constituency
Candidate	Party	Votes	%
Sergey Zenkin	Civic Union	86,483	30.19%
Nadezhda Zotina	Independent	56,418	19.69%
Valery Lyutarevich	Russian Democratic Reform Movement	27,193	9.49%
Dmitry Belov	Party of Russian Unity and Accord	24,753	8.64%
Aleksandr Lyubovskikh	Liberal Democratic Party	19,490	6.80%
Nikolay Spanovsky	Democratic Party	12,066	4.21%
against all		37,152	12.97%
Total		286,461	100%

=== 1995 ===
==== Declared candidates ====
- Vasily Boyko (Independent), businessman
- Sergey Budnitsky (LDPR), party official
- Boris Chernyakov (Yabloko), Institute for US and Canadian Studies sector of agriculture and food head
- Igor Gladkov (Independent), Member of Federation Council (1994–present)
- Valentina Gubernatorova (Kedr), chief sanitary doctor of Ivanovo Oblast (1980–present)
- Vladimir Manyakin (FDD), financial consultant
- Rudolf Martynov (DVR–OD), pharmaceutical businessman
- Albert Shamgulov (Independent), machinery executive
- Yelena Shuvalova (V–N!), community activist
- Aleksandr Sokolov (Independent), former First Secretary of the CPSU Yuryevetsky District Committee (1983–1989), kolkhoz chairman
- Vladimir Tikhonov (CPRF), former People's Deputy of Russia (1990–1993), textiles executive
- Igor Yushkevich (Independent), textiles businessman
- Sergey Zenkin (BIR), incumbent Member of State Duma (1994–present)

==== Results ====
Summary of the 17 December 1995 Russian legislative election in the Kineshma constituency
Candidate	Party	Votes	%
Vladimir Tikhonov	Communist Party	75,819	23.95%
Igor Yushkevich	Independent	47,482	15.00%
Vasily Boyko	Independent	39,664	12.53%
Sergey Zenkin (incumbent)	Ivan Rybkin Bloc	28,568	9.03%
Sergey Budnitsky	Liberal Democratic Party	23,961	7.57%
Aleksandr Sokolov	Independent	23,231	7.34%
Valentina Gubernatorova	Kedr	13,364	4.22%
Yelena Shuvalova	Power to the People	12,412	3.92%
Igor Gladkov	Independent	6,941	2.19%
Boris Chernyakov	Yabloko	5,917	1.87%
Rudolf Martynov	Democratic Choice of Russia – United Democrats	4,694	1.48%
Vladimir Manyakin	Federal Democratic Movement	4,638	1.47%
Albert Shamgulov	Independent	1,973	0.62%
against all		21,057	6.65%
Total		316,536	100%

=== 1999 ===
==== Declared candidates ====
- Valery Agalakov (NDR), businessman
- Marina Anferova (OVR), kolkhoz chairwoman
- Igor Cheryomushkin (LDPR), pensioner
- Sergey Reznik (Independent), transportation executive
- Vladimir Tikhonov (CPRF), incumbent Member of State Duma (1996–present), Chairman of the Duma Committee on Economic Policy (1998–present)
- Viktor Yelizarov (Independent), entrepreneur, orienteering competitor

==== Failed to qualify ====
- Dmitry Golubev (Independent)
- Valery Kulikov (DN), chairman of the party regional office
- Nikolay Mitilev (Independent)

==== Did not file ====
- Vladimir Chernyshyov (K–TR–zSS)
- Olga Gracheva (RPP)
- Sergey Ivanov (Nikolayev–Fyodorov Bloc)
- Vasily Kazayev (Yabloko)
- Zinaida Kovrizhnykh (Independent), union leader
- Anatoly Trefilov (Independent)

==== Results ====
Summary of the 19 December 1999 Russian legislative election in the Kineshma constituency
Candidate	Party	Votes	%
Vladimir Tikhonov (incumbent)	Communist Party	110,153	39.41%
Marina Anferova	Fatherland – All Russia	47,170	16.88%
Viktor Yelizarov	Independent	38,540	13.79%
Igor Cheryomushkin	Liberal Democratic Party	16,971	6.07%
Sergey Reznik	Independent	16,621	5.95%
Valery Agalakov	Our Home – Russia	12,662	4.53%
against all		32,112	11.49%
Total		279,503	100%

=== 2001 ===
==== Declared candidates ====
- Sergey Grigoryev (Independent), unemployed
- Vasily Kopytov (Independent), entrepreneur
- Valentina Krutova (Independent), Head of the Ivanovo Oblast Department of Education (2001–present)
- Viktor Yelizarov (Independent), nonprofit president, 1999 candidate for this seat

==== Withdrawn candidates ====
- Oleg Panko (Independent), liquidation manager
- Viktor Smirnov (Independent), First Deputy Mayor of Kokhma

==== Failed to qualify ====
- Igor Cheryomushkin (Independent), Member of Teykovo City Council, 1999 candidate for this seat
- Arkady Golitsyn (Independent), community activist
- Yury Lyubichev (Independent), community activist
- Alexander Rutskoy (Independent), former Governor of Kursk Oblast (1996–2000), former Vice President of Russia (1991–1993)
- Tatyana Sergeyeva (Independent), Head of the Ivanovo Oblast State Employment Service (1998–present)
- Nikolay Zhuravlev (Independent)

==== Results ====
Summary of the 27 May 2001 by-election in the Kineshma constituency
Candidate	Party	Votes	%
Valentina Krutova	Independent	61,119	55.91%
Viktor Yelizarov	Independent	30,748	28.13%
Sergey Grigoryev	Independent	5,852	5.25%
Vasily Kopytov	Independent	2,086	1.91%
against all		7,458	6.82%
Total		109,325	100%

=== 2003 ===
==== Declared candidates ====
- Mikhail Babich (United Russia), former First Deputy Governor of Ivanovo Oblast – Permanent Representative in Moscow (2001–2002)
- Aleksandr Maslov (PVR-RPZh), Mayor of Shuya (2000–present)
- Valery Nevolin (Yabloko), middle school teacher
- Alyona Shevyakova (LDPR), aide to Legislative Assembly of Ivanovo Oblast member Sergey Sirotkin

==== Withdrawn candidates ====
- Valentina Krutova (CPRF), incumbent Member of State Duma (2001–present)

==== Failed to qualify ====
- Marina Anferova (APR), kolkhoz chairwoman, 1999 OVR candidate for this seat
- Aleksandr Golubev (KPE), unemployed
- Viktor Krepin (ORP Rus'), nonprofit director

==== Did not file ====
- Vitaly Bladtsev (Independent), legal counsel
- Andrey Loginov (ZRS), attorney
- Sergey Sirotkin (LDPR), Member of Legislative Assembly of Ivanovo Oblast (1996–present), 1996 gubernatorial candidate

==== Declined ====
- Yury Smirnov (Independent), petrochemical businessman

==== Results ====
Summary of the 7 December 2003 Russian legislative election in the Kineshma constituency
Candidate	Party	Votes	%
Mikhail Babich	United Russia	91,404	40.47%
Aleksandr Maslov	Party of Russia's Rebirth-Russian Party of Life	50,990	22.57%
Alyona Shevyakova	Liberal Democratic Party	23,458	10.39%
Valery Nevolin	Yabloko	12,226	5.41%
against all		40,872	18.09%
Total		226,043	100%

=== 2016 ===
==== Declared candidates ====
- Yury Ganenko (GP), former First Deputy Head of Yuzhsky District (2011)
- Vladimir Klyonov (CPRF), Member of Ivanovo Oblast Duma (2013–present)
- Viktor Kuzmenko (CPCR), former Member of Vichuga City Council (2006–2015)
- Ivan Melnikov (Yabloko), logistics businessman
- Dmitry Sivokhin (A Just Russia), construction materials businessman
- Yury Smirnov (United Russia), former Senator from Ivanovo Oblast (2004–2013)
- Andrey Valkov (Patriots of Russia), electrician
- Maksim Veryasov (LDPR), aide to Ivanovo Oblast Duma member Dmitry Shelyakin

==== Results ====
Summary of the 18 September 2016 Russian legislative election in the Kineshma constituency
Candidate	Party	Votes	%
Yury Smirnov	United Russia	56,666	36.83%
Vladimir Klyonov	Communist Party	38,299	24.89%
Maksim Veryasov	Liberal Democratic Party	21,963	14.28%
Dmitry Sivokhin	A Just Russia	12,277	7.98%
Viktor Kuzmenko	Communists of Russia	6,427	4.18%
Andrey Valkov	Patriots of Russia	5,878	3.82%
Ivan Melnikov	Yabloko	5,817	3.78%
Yury Ganenko	Civic Platform	1,546	1.00%
Total		153,855	100%

=== 2021 ===
==== Declared candidates ====
- Mikhail Kizeyev (United Russia), Member of Ivanovo Oblast Duma (2015–present), sanatorium chief doctor
- Denis Komarovsky (Rodina), journalist
- Oleg Lebedev (The Greens), former Member of Ivanovo City Duma (2015–2020)
- Mikhail Mikhaylov (New People), unemployed
- Stanislav Nizovskikh (CPCR), unemployed
- Aleksey Pereletov (LDPR), Member of Kokhma City Duma (2020–present), manager
- Pavel Popov (A Just Russia), Member of Ivanovo Oblast Duma (2005–2013, 2018–present), textiles businessman, 2018 gubernatorial candidate
- Sergey Rimsky (Yabloko), former police officer
- Nikolay Yershov (RPPSS), former Head of Puchezhsky District (2005–2018)

==== Removed from the ballot ====
- Yevgeny Gorbachev (CPRF), billionaire construction businessman

==== Failed to qualify ====
- Ivan Ovchinnikov (Independent), unemployed

==== Declined ====
- Dmitry Dmitriyev (United Russia), Member of Ivanovo Oblast Duma (2017–present) (lost the primary)
- Yury Smirnov (United Russia), incumbent Member of State Duma (2016–present)
- Igor Svetushkov (United Russia), Member of Ivanovo Oblast Duma (2013–present) (lost the primary)
- Julia Volkova (United Russia), singer, former member of t.A.T.u. (lost the primary)

==== Results ====
Summary of the 17-19 September 2021 Russian legislative election in the Kineshma constituency
Candidate	Party	Votes	%
Mikhail Kizeyev	United Russia	48,191	34.64%
Stanislav Nizovskikh	Communists of Russia	15,929	11.45%
Pavel Popov	A Just Russia — For Truth	12,209	8.77%
Nikolay Yershov	Party of Pensioners	10,718	7.70%
Sergey Rimsky	Yabloko	10,114	7.27%
Aleksey Pereletov	Liberal Democratic Party	9,865	7.09%
Mikhail Mikhaylov	New People	9,629	6.92%
Denis Komarovsky	Rodina	8,607	6.19%
Oleg Lebedev	The Greens	3,550	2.55%
Total		139,135	100%
