= Lezhnevo =

Lezhnevo (Russian: Лежнево) or Lezhnyovo (Лежнёво) is the name of several inhabited localities in Russia.

== Urban localities ==
- Lezhnevo, Ivanovo Oblast, a settlement in Lezhnevsky District of Ivanovo Oblast

== Rural localities ==
- Lezhnevo, Antropovsky District, Kostroma Oblast, a selo in Kotelnikovskoye Settlement of Antropovsky District of Kostroma Oblast
- Lezhnevo, Kostromskoy District, Kostroma Oblast, a village in Serednyakovskoye Settlement of Kostromskoy District of Kostroma Oblast
- Lezhnevo, Pskov Oblast, a village in Pushkinogorsky District of Pskov Oblast
- Lezhnevo, Kashinsky District, Tver Oblast, a village in Kashinsky District, Tver Oblast
- Lezhnevo, Likhoslavlsky District, Tver Oblast, a village in Likhoslavlsky District, Tver Oblast
- Lezhnevo, Ostashkovsky District, Tver Oblast, a village in Ostashkovsky District, Tver Oblast
- Lezhnevo, Staritsky District, Tver Oblast, a village in Staritsky District, Tver Oblast

== See also ==
- Lezhnevsky (disambiguation)
