= Ignatikha, Ivanovo Oblast =

Ignatikha Игнатиха
- Village
- Location within Ivanovo Oblast Location within Russia
- Coordinates: 56°51′N 40°47′E
- Country: Russia
- Region: Ivanovo Oblast
- District: Lezhnevsky District
- Time zone: UTC+3:00

Ignatikha (Russian: Игнатиха) is a rural locality (a village) in Lezhnevsky District, Ivanovo Oblast, Russia. Population: 17 (2010 census);

== Geography ==
This rural locality is located 12 kilometres (7.5 mi) from Lezhnevo (the district's administrative centre), 18 kilometres (11 mi) from Ivanovo (capital of Ivanovo Oblast) and 229 kilometres (142 mi) from Moscow. Osinovka is the nearest rural locality.
