= Telegino, Ivanovo Oblast =

Telegino Телегино
- Village
- Location within Ivanovo Oblast Location within Russia
- Coordinates: 56°47′N 40°46′E
- Country: Russia
- Region: Ivanovo Oblast
- District: Lezhnevsky District
- Time zone: UTC+3:00

Telegino (Russian: Телегино) is a rural locality (a village) in Lezhnevsky District, Ivanovo Oblast, Russia. Population: 225 (2010 census);

== Geography ==
This rural locality is located 8 kilometres (5.0 mi) from Lezhnevo (the district's administrative centre), 25 kilometres (16 mi) from Ivanovo (capital of Ivanovo Oblast) and 224 kilometres (139 mi) from Moscow. Arzhanovo is the nearest rural locality.
