= Kornevo, Lezhnevsky District, Ivanovo Oblast =

Kornevo Корнево
- Village
- Location within Ivanovo Oblast Location within Russia
- Coordinates: 56°42′N 41°03′E
- Country: Russia
- Region: Ivanovo Oblast
- District: Lezhnevsky District
- Time zone: UTC+3:00

Kornevo (Russian: Корнево) is a rural locality (a village) in Lezhnevsky District, Ivanovo Oblast, Russia. Population: 81 (2010 census);

== Geography ==
This rural locality is located 12 kilometres (7.5 mi) from Lezhnevo (the district's administrative centre), 31 kilometres (19 mi) from Ivanovo (capital of Ivanovo Oblast) and 236 kilometres (147 mi) from Moscow. Novye Gorki is the nearest rural locality.
