= Takovets =

Takovets Таковец
- Village
- Location within Ivanovo Oblast Location within Russia
- Coordinates: 56°50′N 40°43′E
- Country: Russia
- Region: Ivanovo Oblast
- District: Lezhnevsky District
- Time zone: UTC+3:00

Takovets (Russian: Таковец) is a rural locality (a village) in Lezhnevsky District, Ivanovo Oblast, Russia. Population: 12 (2010 census);

== Geography ==
This rural locality is located 13 kilometres (8.1 mi) from Lezhnevo (the district's administrative centre), 22 kilometres (14 mi) from Ivanovo (capital of Ivanovo Oblast) and 225 kilometres (140 mi) from Moscow. Kunyatikha is the nearest rural locality.
