= Kudrevatik =

Kudrevatik Кудреватик
- Village
- Location within Ivanovo Oblast Location within Russia
- Coordinates: 56°45′N 40°48′E
- Country: Russia
- Region: Ivanovo Oblast
- District: Lezhnevsky District
- Time zone: UTC+3:00

Kudrevatik (Russian: Кудреватик) is a rural locality (a village) in Lezhnevsky District, Ivanovo Oblast, Russia. Population: 5 (2010 census);

== Geography ==
This rural locality is located 5 kilometres (3.1 mi) from Lezhnevo (the district's administrative centre), 28 kilometres (17 mi) from Ivanovo (capital of Ivanovo Oblast) and 224 kilometres (139 mi) from Moscow. Uvalyevo is the nearest rural locality.
