= Perepechino Bolshoye =

Perepechino Bolshoye Перепечино Большое
- Village
- Location within Ivanovo Oblast Location within Russia
- Coordinates: 56°45′N 40°57′E
- Country: Russia
- Region: Ivanovo Oblast
- District: Lezhnevsky District
- Time zone: UTC+3:00

Perepechino Bolshoye (Russian: Перепечино Большое) is a rural locality (a village) in Lezhnevsky District, Ivanovo Oblast, Russia. Population: 35 (2010 census);

== Geography ==
This rural locality is located 4 kilometres (2.5 mi) from Lezhnevo (the district's administrative centre), 26 kilometres (16 mi) from Ivanovo (capital of Ivanovo Oblast) and 232 kilometres (144 mi) from Moscow. Krutovo is the nearest rural locality.
