= Bolgovo Bolshoye =

Bolgovo Bolshoye Болгово Большое
- Village
- Location within Ivanovo Oblast Location within Russia
- Coordinates: 56°48′N 40°44′E
- Country: Russia
- Region: Ivanovo Oblast
- District: Lezhnevsky District
- Time zone: UTC+3:00

Bolgovo Bolshoye (Russian: Болгово Большое) is a rural locality (a village) in Lezhnevsky District, Ivanovo Oblast, Russia. Population: 12 (2010 census);

== Geography ==
This rural locality is located 10 kilometres (6.2 mi) from Lezhnevo (the district's administrative centre), 25 kilometres (16 mi) from Ivanovo (capital of Ivanovo Oblast) and 223 kilometres (139 mi) from Moscow. Bolgovo Maloye is the nearest rural locality.
