= Rastilkovo Maloye =

Rastilkovo Maloye Растилково Малое
- Village
- Location within Ivanovo Oblast Location within Russia
- Coordinates: 56°37′N 40°59′E
- Country: Russia
- Region: Ivanovo Oblast
- District: Lezhnevsky District
- Time zone: UTC+3:00

Rastilkovo Maloye (Russian: Растилково Малое) is a rural locality (a village) in Lezhnevsky District, Ivanovo Oblast, Russia. Population: 144 (2010 census);

== Geography ==
This rural locality is located 18 kilometres (11 mi) from Lezhnevo (the district's administrative centre), 42 kilometres (26 mi) from Ivanovo (capital of Ivanovo Oblast) and 227 kilometres (141 mi) from Moscow. Romanki is the nearest rural locality.
