= Stafurovo =

Stafurovo Стафурово
- Village
- Location within Ivanovo Oblast Location within Russia
- Coordinates: 56°38′N 40°56′E
- Country: Russia
- Region: Ivanovo Oblast
- District: Lezhnevsky District
- Time zone: UTC+3:00

Stafurovo (Russian: Стафурово) is a rural locality (a village) in Lezhnevsky District, Ivanovo Oblast, Russia. Population: 5 (2010 census);

== Geography ==
This rural locality is located 15 kilometres (9.3 mi) from Lezhnevo (the district's administrative centre), 39 kilometres (24 mi) from Ivanovo (capital of Ivanovo Oblast) and 226 kilometres (140 mi) from Moscow. Volotovo is the nearest rural locality.
