= Sabinovo =

Sabinovo Сабиново
- Village
- Location within Ivanovo Oblast Location within Russia
- Coordinates: 56°49′N 40°56′E
- Country: Russia
- Region: Ivanovo Oblast
- District: Lezhnevsky District
- Time zone: UTC+3:00

Sabinovo (Russian: Сабиново) is a rural locality (a village) in Lezhnevsky District, Ivanovo Oblast, Russia. Population: 349 (2010 census);

== Geography ==
This rural locality is located 6 kilometres (3.7 mi) from Lezhnevo (the district's administrative centre), 19 kilometres (12 mi) from Ivanovo (capital of Ivanovo Oblast) and 234 kilometres (145 mi) from Moscow. Skokovo is the nearest rural locality.
