= Samushino =

Samushino Самушино
- Village
- Location within Ivanovo Oblast Location within Russia
- Coordinates: 56°37′N 40°57′E
- Country: Russia
- Region: Ivanovo Oblast
- District: Lezhnevsky District
- Time zone: UTC+3:00

Samushino (Russian: Самушино) is a rural locality (a village) in Lezhnevsky District, Ivanovo Oblast, Russia. Population: 48 (2010 census);

== Geography ==
This rural locality is located 17 kilometres (11 mi) from Lezhnevo (the district's administrative centre), 41 kilometres (25 mi) from Ivanovo (capital of Ivanovo Oblast) and 226 kilometres (140 mi) from Moscow. Rastilkovo Bolshoye is the nearest rural locality.
