= Vysokovo, Lezhnevsky District, Ivanovo Oblast =

Vysokovo Высоково
- Village
- Location within Ivanovo Oblast Location within Russia
- Coordinates: 56°42′N 40°51′E
- Country: Russia
- Region: Ivanovo Oblast
- District: Lezhnevsky District
- Time zone: UTC+3:00

Vysokovo (Russian: Высоково) is a rural locality (a village) in Lezhnevsky District, Ivanovo Oblast, Russia. Population: 67 (2010 census);

== Geography ==
This rural locality is located 7 kilometres (4.3 mi) from Lezhnevo (the district's administrative centre), 31 kilometres (19 mi) from Ivanovo (capital of Ivanovo Oblast) and 225 kilometres (140 mi) from Moscow. Afanasovo is the nearest rural locality.
