= Stoyantsevo =

Stoyantsevo Стоянцево
- Village
- Location within Ivanovo Oblast Location within Russia
- Coordinates: 56°53′N 40°45′E
- Country: Russia
- Region: Ivanovo Oblast
- District: Lezhnevsky District
- Time zone: UTC+3:00

Stoyantsevo (Russian: Стоянцево) is a rural locality (a selo) in Lezhnevsky District, Ivanovo Oblast, Russia. Population: 38 (2010 census);

== Geography ==
This rural locality is located 16 kilometres (9.9 mi) from Lezhnevo (the district's administrative centre), 17 kilometres (11 mi) from Ivanovo (capital of Ivanovo Oblast) and 229 kilometres (142 mi) from Moscow. Yefremovo is the nearest rural locality.
