= Shparikha =

Shparikha Шпариха
- Village
- Location within Ivanovo Oblast Location within Russia
- Coordinates: 56°39′N 40°51′E
- Country: Russia
- Region: Ivanovo Oblast
- District: Lezhnevsky District
- Time zone: UTC+3:00

Shparikha (Russian: Шпариха) is a rural locality (a village) in Lezhnevsky District, Ivanovo Oblast, Russia. Population: 10 (2010 census);

== Geography ==
This rural locality is located 13 kilometres (8.1 mi) from Lezhnevo (the district's administrative centre), 38 kilometres (24 mi) from Ivanovo (capital of Ivanovo Oblast) and 222 kilometres (138 mi) from Moscow. Zhukovitsy is the nearest rural locality.
