= Romanki, Ivanovo Oblast =

Romanki Романки
- Village
- Location within Ivanovo Oblast Location within Russia
- Coordinates: 56°36′N 40°59′E
- Country: Russia
- Region: Ivanovo Oblast
- District: Lezhnevsky District
- Time zone: UTC+3:00

Romanki (Russian: Романки) is a rural locality (a village) in Lezhnevsky District, Ivanovo Oblast, Russia. Population: 21 (2010 census);

== Geography ==
This rural locality is located 19 kilometres (12 mi) from Lezhnevo (the district's administrative centre), 42 kilometres (26 mi) from Ivanovo (capital of Ivanovo Oblast) and 227 kilometres (141 mi) from Moscow. Rastilkovo Maloye is the nearest rural locality.
