= Yakovlevo, Lezhnevsky District, Ivanovo Oblast =

Yakovlevo Яковлево
- Village
- Location within Ivanovo Oblast Location within Russia
- Coordinates: 56°47′N 40°51′E
- Country: Russia
- Region: Ivanovo Oblast
- District: Lezhnevsky District
- Time zone: UTC+3:00

Yakovlevo (Russian: Яковлево) is a rural locality (a village) in Lezhnevsky District, Ivanovo Oblast, Russia. Population: 55 (2010 census);

== Geography ==
This rural locality is located 4 kilometres (2.5 mi) from Lezhnevo (the district's administrative centre), 23 kilometres (14 mi) from Ivanovo (capital of Ivanovo Oblast) and 229 kilometres (142 mi) from Moscow. Dorikha is the nearest rural locality.
