= Aladino =

Aladino Аладино
- Village
- Location within Ivanovo Oblast Location within Russia
- Coordinates: 56°51′N 40°42′E
- Country: Russia
- Region: Ivanovo Oblast
- District: Lezhnevsky District
- Time zone: UTC+3:00

Aladino (Russian: Аладино) is a rural locality (a village) in Lezhnevsky District, Ivanovo Oblast, Russia. Population: 14 (2010 census);

== Geography ==
This rural locality is located 15 kilometres (9.3 mi) from Lezhnevo (the district's administrative centre), 22 kilometres (14 mi) from Ivanovo (capital of Ivanovo Oblast) and 224 kilometres (139 mi) from Moscow. Krasny Ostrov is the nearest rural locality.
