= Velikodvorskoye =

Velikodvorskoye Великодворское
- Village
- Location within Ivanovo Oblast Location within Russia
- Coordinates: 56°46′N 40°50′E
- Country: Russia
- Region: Ivanovo Oblast
- District: Lezhnevsky District
- Time zone: UTC+3:00

Velikodvorskoye (Russian: Великодворское) is a rural locality (a village) in Lezhnevsky District, Ivanovo Oblast, Russia. Population: 36 (2010 census);

== Geography ==
This rural locality is located 3 kilometres (1.9 mi) from Lezhnevo (the district's administrative centre), 25 kilometres (16 mi) from Ivanovo (capital of Ivanovo Oblast) and 337 kilometres (209 mi) from Moscow. Kozino is the nearest rural locality.
