= Novye Gorki =

Novye Gorki Новые Горки
- Village
- Location within Ivanovo Oblast Location within Russia
- Coordinates: 56°43′N 41°03′E
- Country: Russia
- Region: Ivanovo Oblast
- District: Lezhnevsky District
- Time zone: UTC+3:00

Novye Gorki (Russian: Новые Горки) is a rural locality (a selo) in Lezhnevsky District, Ivanovo Oblast, Russia. Population: 2,775 (2010 census);

== Geography ==
This rural locality is located 11 kilometres (6.8 mi) from Lezhnevo (the district's administrative centre), 30 kilometres (19 mi) from Ivanovo (capital of Ivanovo Oblast) and 236 kilometres (147 mi) from Moscow. Stary Karachun is the nearest rural locality.
