= Grezino, Ivanovo Oblast =

Grezino Грезино
- Village
- Location within Ivanovo Oblast Location within Russia
- Coordinates: 56°45′N 41°05′E
- Country: Russia
- Region: Ivanovo Oblast
- District: Lezhnevsky District
- Time zone: UTC+3:00

Grezino (Russian: Грезино) is a rural locality (a village) in Lezhnevsky District, Ivanovo Oblast, Russia. Population: 49 (2010 census);

== Geography ==
This rural locality is located 12 kilometres (7.5 mi) from Lezhnevo (the district's administrative centre), 28 kilometres (17 mi) from Ivanovo (capital of Ivanovo Oblast) and 238 kilometres (148 mi) from Moscow. Brusnizhnovo is the nearest rural locality.
