= Arefino, Lezhnevsky District, Ivanovo Oblast =

Arefino Арефино
- Village
- Location within Ivanovo Oblast Location within Russia
- Coordinates: 56°47′N 41°07′E
- Country: Russia
- Region: Ivanovo Oblast
- District: Lezhnevsky District
- Time zone: UTC+3:00

Arefino (Russian: Арефино) is a rural locality (a village) in Lezhnevsky District, Ivanovo Oblast, Russia. Population: 56 (2010 census);

== Geography ==
This rural locality is located 14 kilometres (8.7 mi) from Lezhnevo (the district's administrative centre), 24 kilometres (15 mi) from Ivanovo (capital of Ivanovo Oblast) and 243 kilometres (151 mi) from Moscow. Parshnevo is the nearest rural locality.
