= Gruznikha =

Gruznikha Грузниха
- Village
- Location within Ivanovo Oblast Location within Russia
- Coordinates: 56°45′N 40°44′E
- Country: Russia
- Region: Ivanovo Oblast
- District: Lezhnevsky District
- Time zone: UTC+3:00

Gruznikha (Russian: Грузниха) is a rural locality (a village) in Lezhnevsky District, Ivanovo Oblast, Russia. Population: 5 (2010 census);

== Geography ==
This rural locality is located 9 kilometres (5.6 mi) from Lezhnevo (the district's administrative centre), 29 kilometres (18 mi) from Ivanovo (capital of Ivanovo Oblast) and 221 kilometres (137 mi) from Moscow. Bushmanovo is the nearest rural locality.
