= Yesino, Ivanovo Oblast =

Yesino Есино
- Village
- Location within Ivanovo Oblast Location within Russia
- Coordinates: 56°43′N 41°01′E
- Country: Russia
- Region: Ivanovo Oblast
- District: Lezhnevsky District
- Time zone: UTC+3:00

Yesino (Russian: Есино) is a rural locality (a village) in Lezhnevsky District, Ivanovo Oblast, Russia. Population: 29 (2010 census);

== Geography ==
This rural locality is located 10 kilometres (6.2 mi) from Lezhnevo (the district's administrative centre), 30 kilometres (19 mi) from Ivanovo (capital of Ivanovo Oblast) and 234 kilometres (145 mi) from Moscow. Stary Karachun is the nearest rural locality.
