= Smerdovo =

Smerdovo Смердово
- Village
- Location within Ivanovo Oblast Location within Russia
- Coordinates: 56°41′N 40°46′E
- Country: Russia
- Region: Ivanovo Oblast
- District: Lezhnevsky District
- Time zone: UTC+3:00

Smerdovo (Russian: Смердово) is a rural locality (a selo) in Lezhnevsky District, Ivanovo Oblast, Russia. Population: 12 (2010 census);

== Geography ==
This rural locality is located 12 kilometres (7.5 mi) from Lezhnevo (the district's administrative centre), 35 kilometres (22 mi) from Ivanovo (capital of Ivanovo Oblast) and 219 kilometres (136 mi) from Moscow. Medvedkovo is the nearest rural locality.
