= Dudino, Lezhnevsky District, Ivanovo Oblast =

Dudino Дудино
- Village
- Location within Ivanovo Oblast Location within Russia
- Coordinates: 56°44′N 41°03′E
- Country: Russia
- Region: Ivanovo Oblast
- District: Lezhnevsky District
- Time zone: UTC+3:00

Dudino (Russian: Дудино) is a rural locality (a village) in Lezhnevsky District, Ivanovo Oblast, Russia. Population: 56 (2010 census);

== Geography ==
This rural locality is located 10 kilometres (6.2 mi) from Lezhnevo (the district's administrative centre), 28 kilometres (17 mi) from Ivanovo (capital of Ivanovo Oblast) and 237 kilometres (147 mi) from Moscow. Dyakovo is the nearest rural locality.
