= Ozherelyevo =

Ozherelyevo Ожерельево
- Village
- Location within Ivanovo Oblast Location within Russia
- Coordinates: 56°54′N 40°47′E
- Country: Russia
- Region: Ivanovo Oblast
- District: Lezhnevsky District
- Time zone: UTC+3:00

Ozherelyevo (Russian: Ожерельево) is a rural locality (a village) in Lezhnevsky District, Ivanovo Oblast, Russia. Population: 5 (2010 census);

== Geography ==
This rural locality is located 17 kilometres (11 mi) from Lezhnevo (the district's administrative centre), 14 kilometres (8.7 mi) from Ivanovo (capital of Ivanovo Oblast) and 232 kilometres (144 mi) from Moscow. Stupkino is the nearest rural locality.
