= Vesnevo =

Vesnevo Веснево
- Village
- Location within Ivanovo Oblast Location within Russia
- Coordinates: 56°55′N 40°46′E
- Country: Russia
- Region: Ivanovo Oblast
- District: Lezhnevsky District
- Time zone: UTC+3:00

Vesnevo (Russian: Веснево) is a rural locality (a village) in Lezhnevsky District, Ivanovo Oblast, Russia. Population: 18 (2010 census);

== Geography ==
This rural locality is located 18 kilometres (11 mi) from Lezhnevo (the district's administrative centre), 14 kilometres (8.7 mi) from Ivanovo (capital of Ivanovo Oblast) and 231 kilometres (144 mi) from Moscow. Zhilkino is the nearest rural locality.
