= Korovikha, Ivanovo Oblast =

Korovikha Коровиха
- Village
- Location within Ivanovo Oblast Location within Russia
- Coordinates: 56°44′N 41°05′E
- Country: Russia
- Region: Ivanovo Oblast
- District: Lezhnevsky District
- Time zone: UTC+3:00

Korovikha (Russian: Коровиха) is a rural locality (a village) in Lezhnevsky District, Ivanovo Oblast, Russia. Population: 340 (2010 census);

== Geography ==
This rural locality is located 13 kilometres (8.1 mi) from Lezhnevo (the district's administrative centre), 30 kilometres (19 mi) from Ivanovo (capital of Ivanovo Oblast) and 238 kilometres (148 mi) from Moscow. Novye Gorki is the nearest rural locality.
