= Panyutino, Lezhnevsky District, Ivanovo Oblast =

Panyutino Панютино
- Village
- Location within Ivanovo Oblast Location within Russia
- Coordinates: 56°41′N 41°01′E
- Country: Russia
- Region: Ivanovo Oblast
- District: Lezhnevsky District
- Time zone: UTC+3:00

Panyutino (Russian: Панютино) is a rural locality (a village) in Lezhnevsky District, Ivanovo Oblast, Russia. Population: 5 (2010 census);

== Geography ==
This rural locality is located 12 kilometres (7.5 mi) from Lezhnevo (the district's administrative centre), 33 kilometres (21 mi) from Ivanovo (capital of Ivanovo Oblast) and 233 kilometres (145 mi) from Moscow. Komarnya is the nearest rural locality.
