= Krutovo, Lezhnevsky District, Ivanovo Oblast =

Krutovo Крутово
- Village
- Location within Ivanovo Oblast Location within Russia
- Coordinates: 56°45′N 40°56′E
- Country: Russia
- Region: Ivanovo Oblast
- District: Lezhnevsky District
- Time zone: UTC+3:00

Krutovo (Russian: Крутово) is a rural locality (a village) in Lezhnevsky District, Ivanovo Oblast, Russia. Population: 16 (2010 census);

== Geography ==
This rural locality is located 3 kilometres (1.9 mi) from Lezhnevo (the district's administrative centre), 26 kilometres (16 mi) from Ivanovo (capital of Ivanovo Oblast) and 231 kilometres (144 mi) from Moscow. Perepechino Bolshoye is the nearest rural locality.
