= Lezhnevskaya Roshcha =

Lezhnevskaya Roshcha Лежневская Роща
- Village
- Location within Ivanovo Oblast Location within Russia
- Coordinates: 56°43′N 40°41′E
- Country: Russia
- Region: Ivanovo Oblast
- District: Lezhnevsky District
- Time zone: UTC+3:00

Lezhnevskaya Roshcha (Russian: Лежневская Роща) is a rural locality (a village) in Lezhnevsky District, Ivanovo Oblast, Russia. Population: 9 (2010 census);

== Geography ==
This rural locality is located 13 kilometres (8.1 mi) from Lezhnevo (the district's administrative centre), 34 kilometres (21 mi) from Ivanovo (capital of Ivanovo Oblast) and 216 kilometres (134 mi) from Moscow. Sinyaya Osoka is the nearest rural locality.
