= Markovo Bolshoye =

Markovo Bolshoye Марково Большое
- Village
- Location within Ivanovo Oblast Location within Russia
- Coordinates: 56°50′N 40°51′E
- Country: Russia
- Region: Ivanovo Oblast
- District: Lezhnevsky District
- Time zone: UTC+3:00

Markovo Bolshoye (Russian: Марково Большое) is a rural locality (a village) in Lezhnevsky District, Ivanovo Oblast, Russia. Population: 14 (2010 census);

== Geography ==
This rural locality is located 8 kilometres (5.0 mi) from Lezhnevo (the district's administrative centre), 18 kilometres (11 mi) from Ivanovo (capital of Ivanovo Oblast) and 231 kilometres (144 mi) from Moscow. Gomylenki is the nearest rural locality.
