= Stepannikovo =

Stepannikovo Степанниково
- Village
- Location within Ivanovo Oblast Location within Russia
- Coordinates: 56°49′N 40°56′E
- Country: Russia
- Region: Ivanovo Oblast
- District: Lezhnevsky District
- Time zone: UTC+3:00

Stepannikovo (Russian: Степанниково) is a rural locality (a village) in Lezhnevsky District, Ivanovo Oblast, Russia. Population: 5 (2010 census);

== Geography ==
This rural locality is located 7 kilometres (4.3 mi) from Lezhnevo (the district's administrative centre), 18 kilometres (11 mi) from Ivanovo (capital of Ivanovo Oblast) and 235 kilometres (146 mi) from Moscow. Sabinovo is the nearest rural locality.
