= Apanitsyno =

Apanitsyno Апаницыно
- Village
- Location within Ivanovo Oblast Location within Russia
- Coordinates: 56°51′N 40°57′E
- Country: Russia
- Region: Ivanovo Oblast
- District: Lezhnevsky District
- Time zone: UTC+3:00

Apanitsyno (Russian: Апаницыно) is a rural locality (a village) in Lezhnevsky District, Ivanovo Oblast, Russia. Population: 16 (2010 census);

== Geography ==
This rural locality is located 11 kilometres (6.8 mi) from Lezhnevo (the district's administrative centre), 15 kilometres (9.3 mi) from Ivanovo (capital of Ivanovo Oblast) and 238 kilometres (148 mi) from Moscow. Golyakovo is the nearest rural locality.
