= Vyselikha =

Vyselikha Выселиха
- Village
- Location within Ivanovo Oblast Location within Russia
- Coordinates: 56°47′N 41°05′E
- Country: Russia
- Region: Ivanovo Oblast
- District: Lezhnevsky District
- Time zone: UTC+3:00

Vyselikha (Russian: Выселиха) is a rural locality (a village) in Lezhnevsky District, Ivanovo Oblast, Russia. Population: 14 (2010 census);

== Geography ==
This rural locality is located 13 kilometres (8.1 mi) from Lezhnevo (the district's administrative centre), 23 kilometres (14 mi) from Ivanovo (capital of Ivanovo Oblast) and 241 kilometres (150 mi) from Moscow. Parshnevo is the nearest rural locality.
