= Skokovo, Lezhnevsky District, Ivanovo Oblast =

Skokovo Скоково
- Village
- Location within Ivanovo Oblast Location within Russia
- Coordinates: 56°49′N 40°55′E
- Country: Russia
- Region: Ivanovo Oblast
- District: Lezhnevsky District
- Time zone: UTC+3:00

Skokovo (Russian: Скоково) is a rural locality (a village) in Lezhnevsky District, Ivanovo Oblast, Russia. Population: 20 (2010 census);

== Geography ==
This rural locality is located 6 kilometres (3.7 mi) from Lezhnevo (the district's administrative centre), 19 kilometres (12 mi) from Ivanovo (capital of Ivanovo Oblast) and 233 kilometres (145 mi) from Moscow. Sabinovo is the nearest rural locality.
