= Stary Karachun =

Stary Karachun Старый Карачун
- Village
- Location within Ivanovo Oblast Location within Russia
- Coordinates: 56°43′N 41°02′E
- Country: Russia
- Region: Ivanovo Oblast
- District: Lezhnevsky District
- Time zone: UTC+3:00

Stary Karachun (Russian: Старый Карачун) is a rural locality (a village) in Lezhnevsky District, Ivanovo Oblast, Russia. Population: 19 (2010 census);

== Geography ==
This rural locality is located 10 kilometres (6.2 mi) from Lezhnevo (the district's administrative centre), 30 kilometres (19 mi) from Ivanovo (capital of Ivanovo Oblast) and 235 kilometres (146 mi) from Moscow. Dyagilkovo is the nearest rural locality.
