= Volotovo Church =

Assumption Church in Volotovo
- Церковь Успения на Волотовом поле
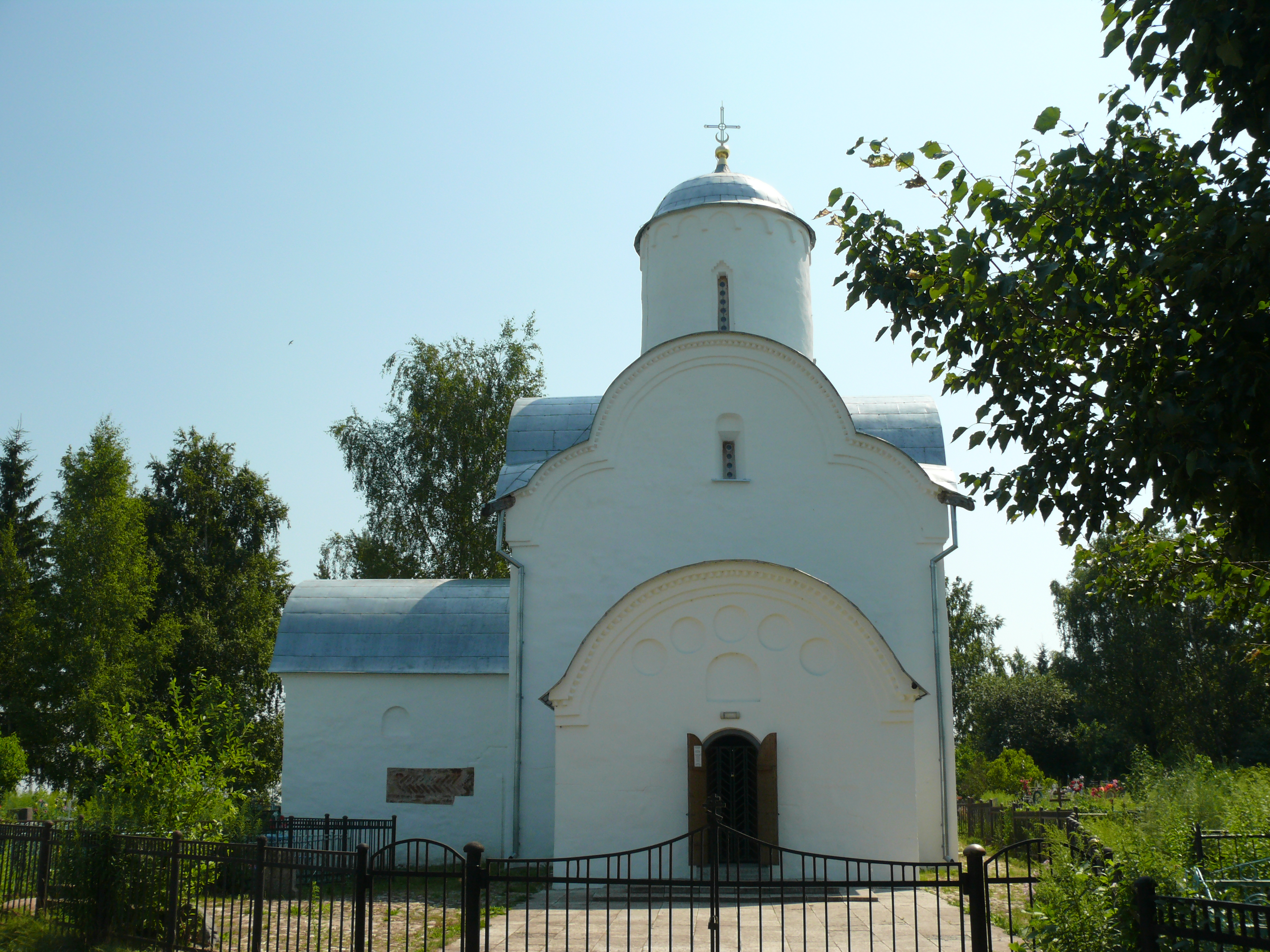
- Assumption Church in Volotovo
- 58°32′14.26″N 31°21′25″E
- Location: Volotovo, close to Veliky Novgorod
- Country: Russia
- Denomination: Russian Orthodox

History
- Dedication: The Assumption of Mary

Architecture
- Style: Russian
- Completed: 1352

The Volotovo Church or the Assumption Church in Volotovo (Russian: Церковь Успения на Волотовом поле, Tserkov Uspeniya na Volotovom Pole) in the village of Volotovo in Novgorodsky District, Novgorod Oblast, Russia was built in 1352. The church was notable mainly for the frescoes presumably made by a disciple of Theophanes the Greek, one of the foremost Russian artists. The church was destroyed to the ground during World War II and restored in the 2000s. Fragments of the frescoes were reconstructed.

The Volotovo Church was designated an architectural monument of federal significance (#5310105000).

== History ==
The church was built in 1352 by Moisey, the archbishop of Novgorod. The church survived the Time of Troubles, when many Novgorod churches were destroyed or damaged by the Swedes. During World War II, the church was at the front line between the Soviet and the German armies for three years and was destroyed. In 1955, Leonid Krasnorechyev performed conservation of the monument. The church was standing as a ruin but was not decaying further. The frescoes were destroyed as well, but the debris was still on the site, and the people tasked with restoration started work on recovering fresco fragments from the debris. In 2003, the building was reconstructed, The author of the reconstruction project was Ninel Kuzmina. In 2004, Krasnorechyev and Kuzmina were awarded the State Prize of the Russian Federation. The work on the frescoes continued, and these were being mounted on the walls after the completion of the church. As of 2007, over a hundred fresco fragments were on restoration. The works were funded by the German company Wintershall Holding AG.

== Frescoes ==
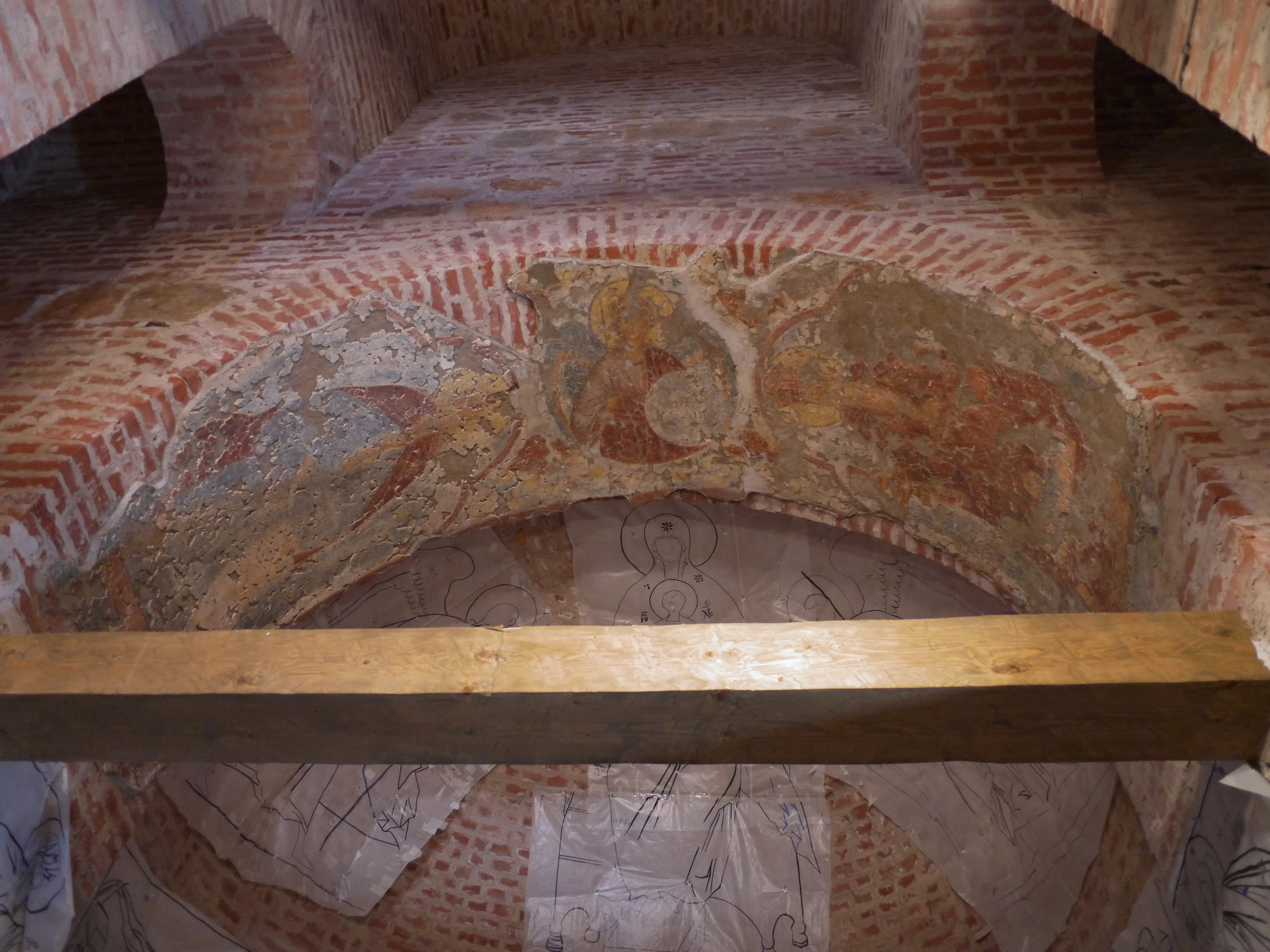
The frescoes of the altar part

The chronicles mention that in 1363 a part of the church was painted, but presumably the frescoes in rest of the interior were created later, around 1380. The whole interior of the church was covered by frescoes, which was common for that time, but almost all fully painted churches were eventually destroyed or lost the original frescoes, and so far the only intact church with the fully painted interior is preserved in the Ferapontov Monastery. The Volotovo frescoes were extensively studied, and black and white photographs of every detail, as well as coloured copies, survived and considerably simplified the restoration. In 1977, the frescoes became the subject of a book of Mikhail Alpatov.

The name of the painter is not known. For a long time, the frescoes were ascribed to Theophanes the Greek, however, it was decided later that the 1380 frescoes did not belong to Theophanes and were essentially more dynamic that all the works of Theophanes. At the time of creation, this was a novel style in Russian art.
