= Volotovo =

Volotovo (Russian: Волотово) is the name of several rural localities in Russia:

- Volotovo, Belgorod Oblast, a selo in Chernyansky District of Belgorod Oblast
- Volotovo, Ivanovo Oblast, a village in Lezhnevsky District of Ivanovo Oblast
- Volotovo, Lipetsk Oblast, a selo in Volotovsky Selsoviet of Lebedyansky District of Lipetsk Oblast
- Volotovo, Novgorod Oblast, a village in Volotovskoye Settlement of Novgorodsky District of Novgorod Oblast
