= Vladimir Tikhonov =

Russian politician

- Владимир Тихонов
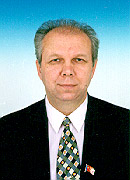

3rd Governor of Ivanovo Oblast
- In office 28 December 2000 – 20 December 2005
- Preceded by: Vladislav Tikhomirov
- Succeeded by: Mikhail Men

1st Chairman of the Politburo of the All-Russian Communist Party of the Future
- In office 11 September 2004 – 8 July 2006
- Succeeded by: Aleksandr Kuvayev

Personal details
- Born: 4 February 1947 (age 79) Volotovo, Lezhnevsky District, Ivanovo Oblast, RSFSR, Soviet Union
- Party: Communist Party of the Russian Federation

Vladimir Ilyich Tikhonov (Russian: Владимир Ильич Тихонов; born 4 February 1947) is a Russian politician and has been a leading member of the Communist Party of the Russian Federation.

Tikhonov served as the manager of the Russian airline Aeroflot during the 1990s and helped to modernize it, whilst running it as a partnership between the government and the private sector. Despite some success Tikhonov was dismissed from his post on the advice of major shareholder Boris Berezovsky, one of the leading Russian oligarchs.

As a leading member of the Communist Party Tikhonov rose to the position of Chairman of the Central Committee, as well as becoming the governor of Ivanovo. Tikhonov clashed with long-standing party leader Gennady Zyuganov over who had control and as a result Zyuganov ensured that Tikhonov lost his Chairmanship. As a result, he set up his own party claiming the Communist Party name, and the two groups even held separate conferences in 2004. Zyuganov accused Tikhinov of being in league with the government although a ruling by the Justice Ministry in August 2004 declared that the party is not legitimate and refused to register it. The group briefly reorganised as the All-Russian Communist Party of the Future, although Tikhonov has since sought to return to Zyuganov's group.
