= Lezhnevsky =

Lezhnevsky (masculine), Lezhnevskaya (feminine), or Lezhnevskoye (neuter) may refer to:

- Lezhnevsky District, a district of Ivanovo Oblast, Russia
- Lezhnevsky (rural locality), a former rural locality (a settlement) in Chulymsky District of Novosibirsk Oblast; abolished in November 2009
