= Volotovo, Ivanovo Oblast =

Volotovo Волотово
- Village
- Location within Ivanovo Oblast Location within Russia
- Coordinates: 56°38′N 40°58′E
- Country: Russia
- Region: Ivanovo Oblast
- District: Lezhnevsky District
- Time zone: UTC+3:00

Volotovo (Russian: Волотово) is a rural locality (a village) in Lezhnevsky District, Ivanovo Oblast, Russia. Population: 7 (2010 census);

== Geography ==
This rural locality is located 16 kilometres (9.9 mi) from Lezhnevo (the district's administrative centre), 39 kilometres (24 mi) from Ivanovo (capital of Ivanovo Oblast) and 227 kilometres (141 mi) from Moscow. Samushino is the nearest rural locality.
