= Uvod =

River in Ivanovo and Vladimir Oblasts, Russia

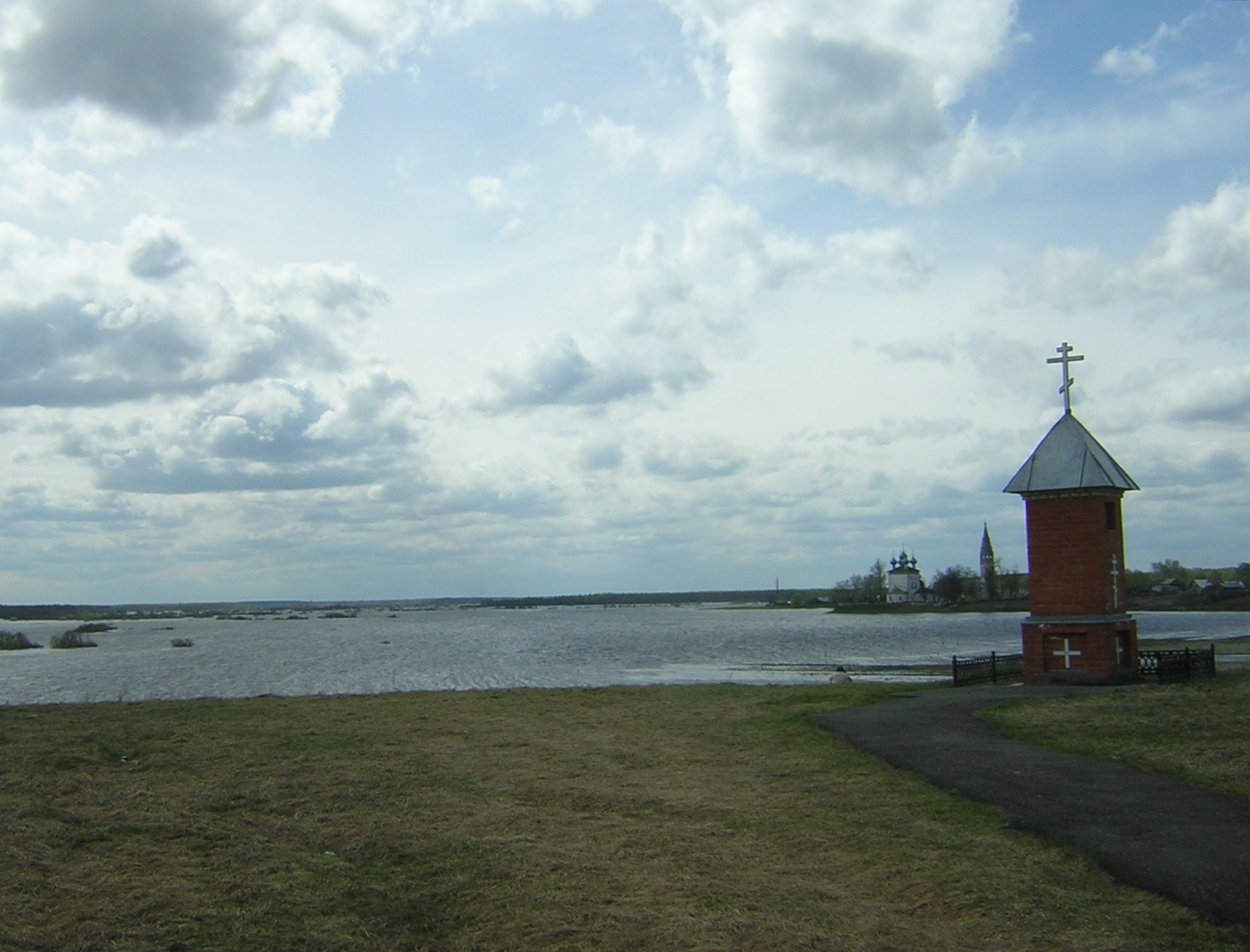
- Native name: Уводь (Russian)

Location
- Country: Russia

Physical characteristics
- Mouth: Klyazma
  - coordinates: 56°25′11″N 41°26′27″E
- Length: 185 km (115 mi)
- Basin size: 3,770 km^{2} (1,460 sq mi)

Basin features
- Progression: Klyazma→ Oka→ Volga→ Caspian Sea

The Uvod (Russian: У́водь) is a river in Ivanovo and Vladimir Oblasts in Russia, a left tributary of the Klyazma (Volga's basin through the Oka). It has a length of 185 km, and the area of its drainage basin is 3,770 km^{2}. The Uvod freezes up in November and breaks up in April. The towns of Ivanovo and Kokhma are located on the Uvod.

The main tributaries are the Ukhtokhma and Vyasma.
