= Strommashina =

The Starommashina
- Company type: Company
- Industry: Joint-stock company
- Founded: 1942; 84 years ago
- Headquarters: Samara, Samara, Russian Federation
- Key people: Alexander O. Komarov (General Director of OAO Strommashina-Sheet (OJSC) Dmitry O. Riman; General Director of OOO Strommashina (LLC)
- Products: production of industrial equipment
- Website: Strommash.com

The Strommashina plant was built in the city of Samara during the Second World War for the purpose of supplying industries of the Soviet Union with essential technical equipment. At present, the plant manufactures equipment for the construction, oil production, roa construction, metallurgy and mining industries. The plant has divisions in Ukraine, Belarus, Kazakhstan and in various cities of Russian Federation.

== History ==
=== The Soviet Union ===
The plant is located 18 kilometers from the city of Kuybyshev (former name of Samara), near the district of Bezymyanka. It was created under Construction Directive No.77 of Narkomat, dated March 23, 1940 Construction started only in January 1941, and the plant's first block was built by May 15, 1941 using the small shops left over from the former construction site. In October 1942, the first technical equipment was assembled and the plant was commissioned, and November 2, 1942 is considered the "birthday" of the Kuybyshev Strommashina Plant, after a newly erected workshop began production of items for military use.

From its establishment up until 1945, the plant’s main specialization was to fulfill urgent governmental orders for the manufacture of metal structures and the installation of towers and radio masts. In 1945, the plant was given a work plan to produce items that were of the utmost importance for the recovery of the USSR economy: rotating steam cylinders, water-jacket furnaces, dampers, drying cylinders and traveling trolleys. The plant also continued the production of items for the Ministry of Defense.

In 1946, the enterprise was renamed the Kuybyshev Strommashina Plant. In 1959, the plant switched from manufacturing relatively simple machines to producing highly complex equipment for the country's construction and chemical industries.

By the early 1960s, the plant was starting to produce larger and more complex equipment – mills, concrete-pouring and concrete-placing machines, and bag filters. More than 50 types of new equipment was produced. This included more than 10 models of mills and concrete-placing machines, four models of drying cylinders, etc.

The plant’s output changed qualitatively. In 1968-70, the plant switched to production of the 6001-6008 series ball and rod mills. Thanks to the use of elastic couplings instead of gear couplings, and the application of self-aligning spherical bearings in roller mills, the durability of these assemblies increased 1.5 to 2 times. To reduce the noise the mills produced, steel linings were replaced with rubber linings. The lining procedure for the mill body became much less laborious.

The plant was awarded the Honor Sign and, since 1982, has been officially called the Kuybyshev Honor Sign Plant Strommashina of the Volga Cement Machine-Building Production Association ("Volgotsemmash") of the Ministry of Construction, Road and Municipal Machine-Building.

=== Russian Federation ===
Since 1991, the plant has been called the Samara Strommashina Plant. Since 2005, the plant has fulfilled annual military item orders from Gosoboronzakaz. The 2008-2009 global crisis has repeatedly influenced the stock of orders and, thus, the plant’s industrial development.

Nevertheless, output has been increased from year to year by expanding into new markets (metallurgy, mineral concentration, etc.). Based on recent market trends, efforts are now being made to increase the diameters and linear dimensions of the rotating equipment and mills being manufactured.

In recent years, the plant has started to produce tangential hammer mills and roller mills. Roller mills are widely used in various industries, namely: construction, chemicals, mining, metallurgy, coal mining, mineral concentration, etc. Roller mills are efficient in grinding materials with maximum hardness of 9.3 and humidity of no more than 6%. The produced fraction range is 0.045 – 1.6 mm and is customer specified. The trapezoidal roller mill with a separator is used for grinding of >1,000 various materials, such as: cement (clinker), limestone, gypsum, talc, slags, graphite, feldspar, coal, dolomite, mica, granite, quartz, marble, etc.

In recent years, equipment has been delivered to the following geographic areas: all regions of Russia, the Baltic states, Ukraine, Belarus, Moldova, Kazakhstan, Uzbekistan, Azerbaijan, Bulgaria, Germany, Poland, and Iran.

In 2010, OOO Strommashina took first place in the Power Engineering Cooperation Contest (in the category of Transport, Small and Medium Businesses) carried out by KES-Holding and OAO Volga TGK in 16 regions.

== Output ==
At various times, the plant has mass-produced dozens of types of crushing, grinding, drying and other equipment:

- ball mills
- rod mills
- drying cylinders
- rotary furnaces
- grinding facilities
- crushers
- bag filters
- cyclones
- for gypsum binding materials production
- for mineral powder production
- for expanded clay production
- for concrete products production
- for inert materials grinding and drying
- for drilling waste thermal utilization
- specific process equipment
