= Mikhail Kizeyev (politician) =

Russian politician

- Михаил Кизеев
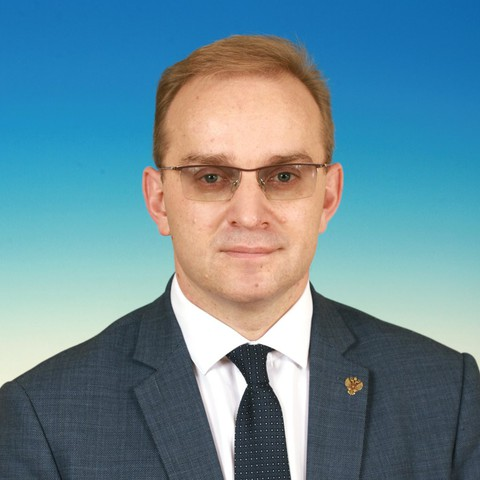
- official portrait, circa 2021

Member of the State Duma for Ivanovo Oblast
- Incumbent
- Assumed office 12 October 2021
- Preceded by: Yury Smirnov
- Constituency: Kineshma (No. 92)

Personal details
- Born: 31 March 1978 (age 48) Ivanovo, RSFSR, USSR
- Party: United Russia
- Education: Ivanovo State Medical Academy

Mikhail Kizeyev (Russian: Михаил Владимирович Кизеев; born March 3, 1978, Ivanovo) is a Russian political figure and deputy of the 8th State Duma. In 2015, he was granted a Candidate of Sciences in Medicine degree.

After graduating from the Ivanovo State Medical Academy, Kizeyev started working as a medical orderly at the Ivanovo City Clinical Hospital No. 4. In 2003, he was appointed a microsurgeon at the eye department of city clinical hospital No.4. From 2010 to 2021, he was the chief physician at the Medical center "Reshma" of the Federal Medical-Biological Agency. From 2015 to 2021, he was a deputy of the Ivanovo Oblast Duma. Since September 2021, he has served as deputy of the 8th State Duma.

== Sanctions ==
He was sanctioned by the UK government in 2022 in relation to the Russo-Ukrainian War.
