= Kokhma =

Town in Ivanovo Oblast, Russia

Kokhma Кохма
- Town
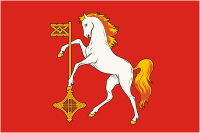
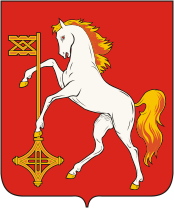
- Flag Coat of arms
- Interactive map of Kokhma
- Location of Kokhma Kokhma (Ivanovo Oblast)
- Coordinates: 56°55′52″N 41°05′20″E
- Country: Russia
- Federal subject: Ivanovo Oblast
- First mentioned: 1619
- Town status since: 1925

Area
  - Total: 12.6 km^{2} (4.9 sq mi)
- Elevation: 120 m (390 ft)

Population (2010 Census)
  - Total: 29,411
  - Estimate (2021): 30,940 (+5.2%)
  - Density: 2,330/km^{2} (6,050/sq mi)

Administrative status
  - Subordinated to: Town of Kokhma
  - Capital of: Town of Kokhma

Municipal status
  - Urban okrug: Kokhma Urban Okrug
  - Capital of: Kokhma Urban Okrug
- Time zone: UTC+3 (MSK)
- Postal code: 153510-153512
- Dialing code: +7 4932
- OKTMO ID: 24706000001
- Website: kohma.ivanovoweb.ru

Kokhma (Russian: Ко́хма) is a town in Ivanovo Oblast, Russia, located on the Uvod River (Klyazma's tributary) 6 kilometers (3.7 mi) southeast of Ivanovo. Population: 30,940 (2021 census); 29,411 (2010 census); 28,761 (2002 census); 26,962 (1989 Soviet census).

== History ==
It was first mentioned in 1619 as the village of Rozhdestvenskoye-Kokhma (Рожде́ственское-Кохма). Town status was granted to it in 1925.

== Administrative and municipal status ==
Within the framework of administrative divisions, it is incorporated as the Town of Kokhma—an administrative unit with the status equal to that of the districts. As a municipal division, the Town of Kokhma is incorporated as Kokhma Urban Okrug.

== Economy ==
- Cotton mill
- Flax-spinning and weaving mill
- Strommashina machine-building factory
