= Sergey Sirotkin (politician) =

Russian politician (1952–2023)

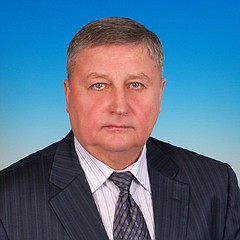
Sirotkin in 2020

Sergey Nikanorovich Sirotkin (Russian: Серге́й Никанорович Сироткин, also transliterated Sergei; 14 April 1952 – 28 May 2023) was a Russian politician who was a member of the State Duma for the Liberal Democratic Party of Russia (LDPR). He was a member of the State Duma's Committee on Economic Policy, Entrepreneurship and Tourism. He was a member of the Communist Party of the Soviet Union, and joined the LDPR in 1991. He graduated from the Krylov Command-Engineering Academy and had a military career.

From 1996 to 2000, Sirotkin was a deputy of the Legislative Assembly of the Ivanovo Region of the 2nd convocation. On 2 March 2008, he was elected to the deputy of the Ivanovo Regional Duma of the fifth convocation.

On 24 February 2016, by a decree of the State Duma, Sirotkin was appointed a member of the Central Election Commission of the Russian Federation.

Sirotkin died on 28 May 2023, at the age of 71.
