= Lezhnevo, Ivanovo Oblast =

Urban locality in Ivanovo Oblast, Russia

Lezhnevo Лежнево
- Urban-type settlement
- Interactive map of Lezhnevo
- Location of Lezhnevo Lezhnevo (Ivanovo Oblast)
- Coordinates: 56°46′30″N 40°53′20″E
- Country: Russia
- Federal subject: Ivanovo Oblast
- Administrative district: Lezhnevsky District

Population (2010 Census)
  - Total: 8,034
  - Estimate (2025): 6,858 (−14.6%)
- Time zone: UTC+3 (MSK)
- Postal code: 155120
- OKTMO ID: 24614151051

Lezhnevo (Russian: Ле́жнево) is an urban-type settlement and the administrative center of Lezhnevsky District, Ivanovo Oblast, Russia. Population: 7,297 (2021 census); 8,034 (2010 census); 8,314 (2002 census); 8,733 (1989 Soviet census).

== Gallery ==
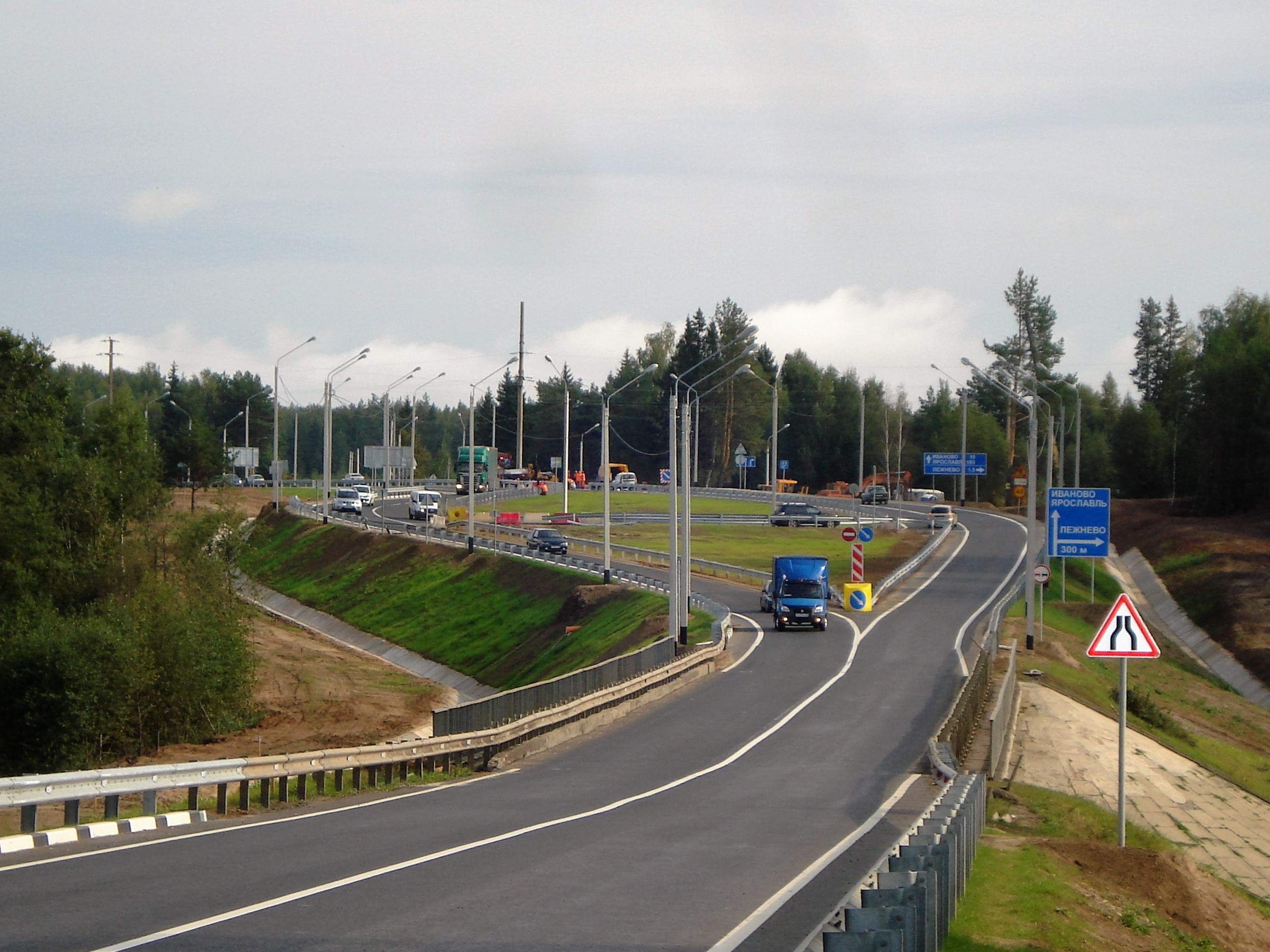
Exit to Lezhnevo from the M7 highway.
