= Lezhnevsky District =

Lezhnevsky District Лежневский район (Russian)
- District
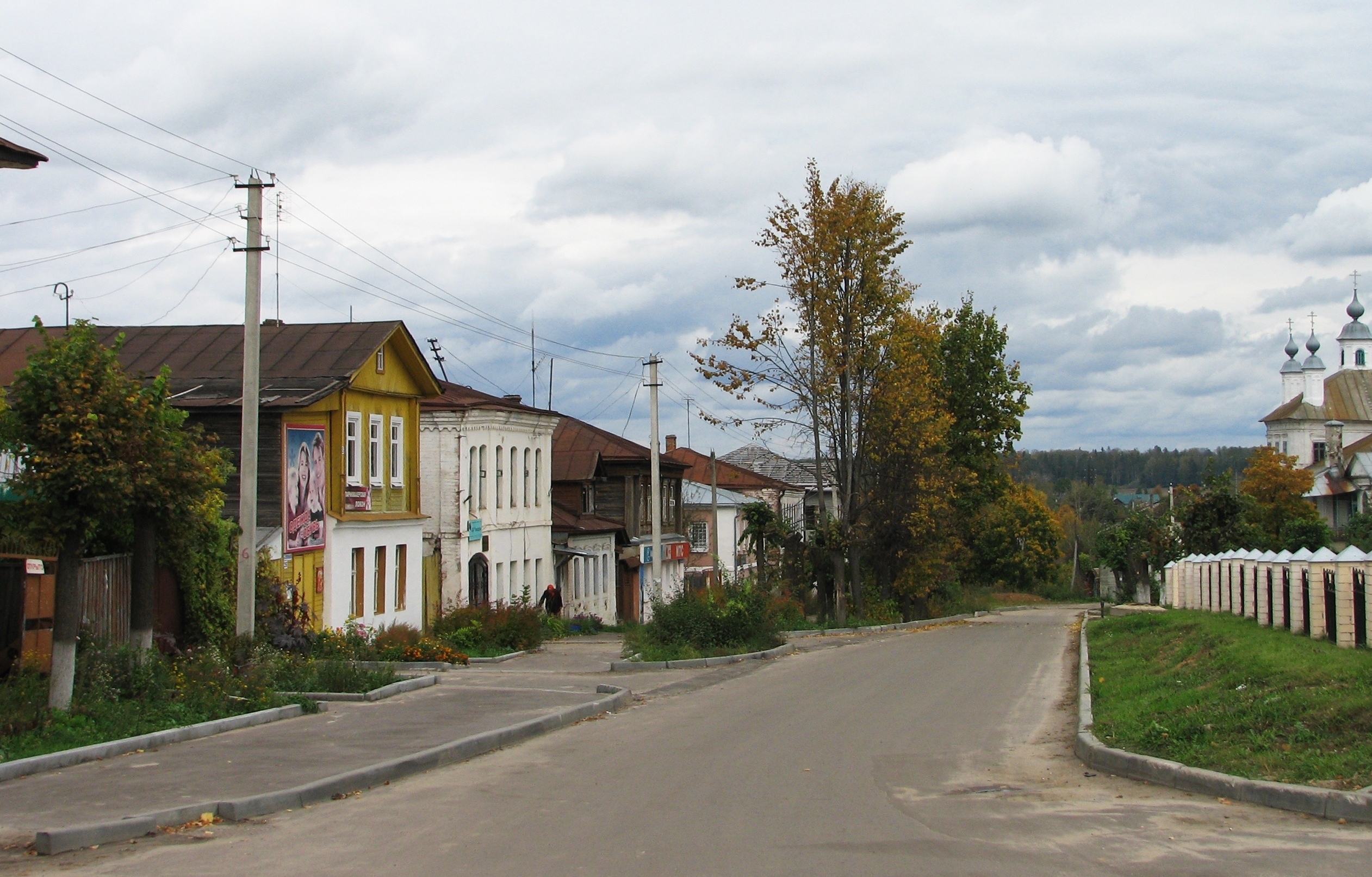
- The urban-type settlement of Lezhnevo, the administrative center of Lezhnevsky District

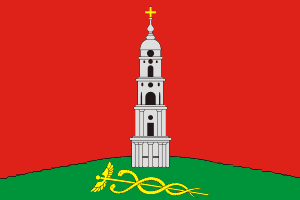
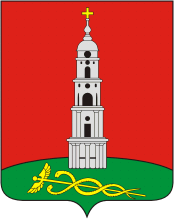
- Flag Coat of arms
- Location of Lezhnevsky District in Ivanovo Oblast
- Coordinates: 56°46′N 40°53′E
- Country: Russia
- Federal subject: Ivanovo Oblast
- Administrative center: Lezhnevo

Area
  - Total: 750 km^{2} (290 sq mi)

Population (2010 Census)
  - Total: 19,001
  - Density: 25/km^{2} (66/sq mi)
  - Urban: 42.3%
  - Rural: 57.7%

Administrative structure
  - Inhabited localities: 131 rural localities

Municipal structure
  - Municipally incorporated as: Lezhnevsky Municipal District
  - Municipal divisions: 1 urban settlements, 4 rural settlements
- Time zone: UTC+3 (MSK)
- OKTMO ID: 24614000
- Website: http://lezhnevo.ru

Lezhnevsky District (Russian: Ле́жневский райо́н) is an administrative and municipal district (raion), one of the twenty-one in Ivanovo Oblast, Russia. It is located in the southwest of the oblast. The area of the district is 750 square kilometers (290 sq mi). Its administrative center is the urban locality (a settlement) of Lezhnevo. Population: 15,508 (2021 census); 19,001 (2010 census); 20,102 (2002 Census); 22,551 (1989 Soviet census). The population of Lezhnevo accounts for 47.1% of the district's total population.
