= 2023 Ivanovo Oblast Duma election =

← 2018	8–10 September 2023	2028 →
- Turnout: 33.87%
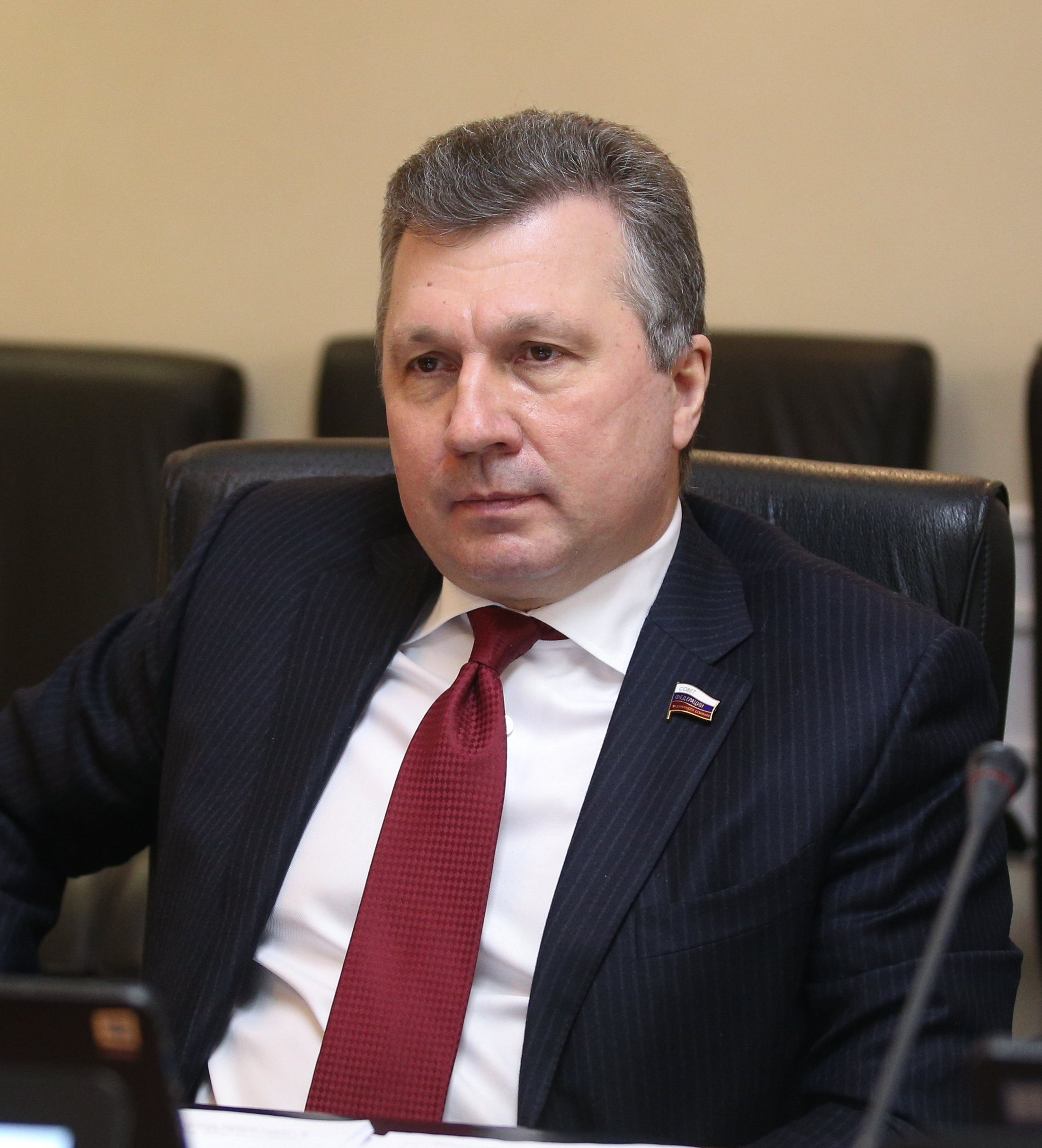
	Majority party	Minority party	Third party
		LDPR	CPRF
Candidate	Valery Vasilyev	Dmitry Shelyakin	Aleksandr Boykov
Leader	Dmitry Medvedev	Leonid Slutsky	Gennady Zyuganov
Party	United Russia	LDPR	CPRF
Last election	15 seats, 34.14%	2 seats, 16.33%	7 seats, 26.92%
Seats won	27	2	1
Seat change	▲12	Steady	▼6
Popular vote	19,520	26,317	25,748
Percentage	65.39%	10.08%	9.86%
Swing	▲31.25%	▼6.25%	▼17.06%
	Fourth party	Fifth party	Sixth party
	CPCR	SR-ZP	NL
Candidate	Aleksandr Orekhov	Pavel Popov	Vyacheslav Bryksin
Leader	Sergey Malinkovich	Sergey Mironov	Aleksey Nechayev
Party	Communists of Russia	SR-ZP	New People
Last election	0 seats, 3.40%	2 seats, 8.22%	Did not exist
Seats won	0	0	0
Seat change	Steady	▼2	Did not exist
Popular vote	11,799	10,592	10,183
Percentage	4.52%	4.06%	3.90%
Swing	▲1.12%	▼4.16%	Did not exist

The 2023 Ivanovo Oblast Duma election took place on 8–10 September 2023, on common election day, coinciding with 2023 Ivanovo Oblast gubernatorial election. All 30 seats in the Oblast Duma were up for reelection.

== Electoral system ==
Under current election laws, the Oblast Duma is elected for a term of five years, with parallel voting. 10 seats are elected by party-list proportional representation with a 5% electoral threshold, with the other half elected in 20 single-member constituencies by first-past-the-post voting. Until 2023 the number of mandates allocated in proportional and majoritarian parts were standing at 13 each. Seats in the proportional part are allocated using the Imperiali quota, modified to ensure that every party list, which passes the threshold, receives at least one mandate.

== Candidates ==
=== Party lists ===
To register regional lists of candidates, parties need to collect 0.5% of signatures of all registered voters in Ivanovo Oblast. Prior to the election oblast-wide part of party lists was abolished with only territorial groups retaining.

The following parties were relieved from the necessity to collect signatures:

- United Russia
- Communist Party of the Russian Federation
- A Just Russia — Patriots — For Truth
- Liberal Democratic Party of Russia
- New People
- Russian Party of Pensioners for Social Justice
- Communists of Russia

№	Party	Territorial groups' leaders	Candidates	Territorial groups	Status
1	United Russia	Igor Volkov • Anastasia Potapova • Anastasia Nikitina • Aleksandr Semenenko • Larisa Belina • Aleksandr Kuzmichyov • Vladimir Smirnov • Aleksey Shirstov • Viktor Toropov • Anna Malyshkina • Vladimir Grishin • Anatoly Burov • Aleksey Mikhaylov • Sergey Mazalov • Olga Yanshenkina • Mikhail Kizeyev • Sergey Chesnokov • Dmitry Klyucharev • Olga Guseva • Valery Vasilyev	100	20	Registered
2	Communists of Russia	Nikolay Makarov • Yekaterina Sokolova • Aleksandr Yemelin • Roman Kiselev • Dmitry Rychkov • Anna Melnik • Aleksey Zhuravlev • Aleksey Fedulov • Mikhail Vinogradov • Galina Kuzmina • Anatoly Timonin • Galina Shtepa • Lyubov Kudryavtseva • Yevgeny Krylov • Olga Koltsova • Aleksandr Orekhov • Andrey Valkov • Antonina Sukhareva • Anatoly Kuvshinov • Natalya Zatanaychenko	83	20	Registered
3	Liberal Democratic Party	Eduard Buliya • David Artyushin • Yelena Romanova • Andrey Filippov • Yekaterina Brezgina • Aleksey Pereletov • Dmitry Promzelev • Dmitry Shelyakin • Sergey Klyuyev • Stanislav Nurzhanov • Dmitry Mastrakov • Tatyana Sokolova • Denis Fomichev • Mikhail Kochetov • Dmitry Denisenkov • Kirill Knyazev	78	16	Registered
4	Communist Party	Olga Mizina • Yevgeny Petrov • Andrey Kvitkov • Andrey Yesaulov • Yury Gusev • Aleksandr Yelchaninov • Ilya Zhuravlev • Dmitry Shevyrin • Irina Korystyleva • Valentin Platonov • Denis Shakhanov • Aleksandr Korovin • Mikhail Varentsov • Nadezhda Konashina • Andrey Podsypanin • Aleksandr Boykov • Anatoly Timokhin • Pavel Smirnov • Stanislav Mishin • Kirill Solovyev	90	20	Registered
5	A Just Russia – For Truth	Ivan Zatonaychenko • Nikolay Bogatov • Aleksandr Volkov • Vyacheslav Tsarev • Leonid Denisov • Vladimir Pogrebnyak • Pavel Popov • Aleksandr Morozov • Viktor Diomidov • Mikhail Dorofeyev • Eduard Allerborn • Ilya Dementyev • Marina Magomedova • Dmitry Lakeyev • Olga Savochkina • Sergey Cheremokhin • Vyacheslav Bulavintsev • Viktor Pismensky • Aleksandr Rakushev • Stepan Perzhola	80	20	Registered
6	New People	Andrey Ivanov • Sergey Zaytsev • Aleksandr Shorygin • Anton Fominykh • Sharaf Ibragimov • Andrey Klimov • Danil Kotler • Ilya Seregin • Alyona Koshurnikova • Nikita Usov • Maksim Moryakov • Marat Aryapov • Aleksey Bodyagin • Natalya Sorokina • Aleksandr Lubkov • Vyacheslav Bryksin • Timur Kuznetsov • Leona Patrakeyeva • Anna Yakunina • Oleg Alyokhin	61	20	Registered

New People will take part in Ivanovo Oblast legislative election for the first time, while Russian Party of Pensioners for Social Justice, Russian Party of Freedom and Justice and Rodina did not file.

=== Single-mandate constituencies ===
20 single-mandate constituencies were formed in Ivanovo Oblast, an increase of 7 seats since last redistricting in 2018. To register candidates in single-mandate constituencies need to collect 3% of signatures of registered voters in the constituency.

Number of candidates in single-mandate constituencies
Party	Candidates	
Party	Nominated	Registered
United Russia	20	20
Communist Party	17	17
Liberal Democratic Party	20	20
A Just Russia — For Truth	20	20
Communists of Russia	19	19
New People	8	8
Party of Pensioners	11	11
Yabloko	1	0
Independent	14	2
Total	130	117

== Polls ==
Fieldwork date	Polling firm	UR	LDPR	SR-ZP	CPRF	NL	CPCR
30 August- 2 September 2023	IvanovoNews	31%	18%	17%	13%	5%	1%

== Results ==
=== Results by party lists ===
Summary of the 8–10 September 2023 Ivanovo Oblast Duma election results
Party	Party list					Constituency		Total	
Party	Votes	%	±pp	Seats	+/–	Seats	+/–	Seats	+/–
United Russia	170,779	65.39	▲31.25%	7	▲2	20	▲10	27	▲12
Liberal Democratic Party	26,317	10.08	▼6.25%	2	Steady	0	Steady	2	Steady
Communist Party	25,748	9.86	▼17.06%	1	▼4	0	▼2	1	▼6
Communists of Russia	11,799	4.52	▲1.12%	0	Steady	0	Steady	0	Steady
A Just Russia — For Truth	10,592	4.06	▼4.16%	0	▼1	0	▼1	0	▼2
New People	10,183	3.90	New	0	New	0	New	0	New
Party of Pensioners	–	–	–	–	–	0	Steady	0	Steady
Independents	–	–	–	–	–	0	Steady	0	Steady
Invalid ballots	5,742	2.20	▼1.45%	—	—	—	—	—	—
Total	261,160	100.00	—	10	▼3	20	▲7	30	▲4
Turnout	261,160	33.87	▲1.01%	—	—	—	—	—	—
Registered voters	771,178	100.00	—	—	—	—	—	—	—

Marina Dmitriyeva (United Russia) was re-elected as Chairwoman of the Oblast Duma, while Valery Vasilyev (United Russia), who previously represented executive authority of Ivanovo Oblast in the Federation Council, was appointed to the chamber, replacing incumbent Senator Alexander Gusakovsky (United Russia).

=== Results in single-member constituencies ===
==== District 1 ====
Summary of the 8–10 September 2023 Ivanovo Oblast Duma election in District 1
Candidate	Party	Votes	%
Igor Volkov	United Russia	6,980	62.34%
Roman Yefremov	Liberal Democratic Party	897	8.01%
Olga Mizina	Communist Party	693	6.19%
Andrey Ivanov	New People	641	5.73%
Nikolay Makarov	Communists of Russia	640	5.72%
Vyacheslav Belousov	Party of Pensioners	531	4.74%
Roman Kurochkin	A Just Russia — For Truth	477	4.26%
Total		11,196	100%

==== District 2 ====
Summary of the 8–10 September 2023 Ivanovo Oblast Duma election in District 2
Candidate	Party	Votes	%
Anastasia Potapova	United Russia	7,332	63.21%
Yevgeny Petrov	Communist Party	1,390	11.98%
Eduard Buliya	Liberal Democratic Party	726	6.26%
Nikolay Bogatov	A Just Russia — For Truth	688	5.93%
Sergey Zaytsev	New People	632	5.45%
Sergey Grebennikov	Communists of Russia	421	3.63%
Total		11,599	100%

==== District 3 ====
Summary of the 8–10 September 2023 Ivanovo Oblast Duma election in District 3
Candidate	Party	Votes	%
Boris Shalyapin	United Russia	6,587	63.76%
Andrey Kvitkov	Communist Party	858	8.31%
Aleksandr Shorygin	New People	765	7.40%
Aleksandr Volkov	A Just Russia — For Truth	715	6.92%
Aleksandr Yemelin	Communists of Russia	637	6.17%
Dmitry Pruger	Liberal Democratic Party	491	4.75%
Total		10,331	100%

==== District 4 ====
Summary of the 8–10 September 2023 Ivanovo Oblast Duma election in District 4
Candidate	Party	Votes	%
Aleksandr Maslennikov	United Russia	6,835	64.68%
David Artyushin	Liberal Democratic Party	1,171	11.08%
Aleksandr Gornostayev	A Just Russia — For Truth	789	7.47%
Andrey Ostashko	Communists of Russia	779	7.37%
Yury Snopov	Party of Pensioners	568	5.37%
Total		10,568	100%

==== District 5 ====
Summary of the 8–10 September 2023 Ivanovo Oblast Duma election in District 5
Candidate	Party	Votes	%
Anna Vlasova	United Russia	5,453	55.56%
Yury Gusev	Communist Party	1,179	12.01%
Yelena Romanova	Liberal Democratic Party	1,133	11.54%
Leonid Denisov	A Just Russia — For Truth	848	8.64%
Nikolay Gusev	Party of Pensioners	641	6.53%
Dmitry Rychkov	Communists of Russia	231	2.35%
Total		9,814	100%

==== District 6 ====
Summary of the 8–10 September 2023 Ivanovo Oblast Duma election in District 6
Candidate	Party	Votes	%
Vasily Maksimov (incumbent)	United Russia	7,818	65.89%
Andrey Filippov	Liberal Democratic Party	1,217	10.26%
Aleksandr Yelchaninov	Communist Party	1,048	8.83%
Vladimir Pogrebnyak	A Just Russia — For Truth	658	5.55%
Anna Melnik	Communists of Russia	614	5.17%
Total		11,866	100%

==== District 7 ====
Summary of the 8–10 September 2023 Ivanovo Oblast Duma election in District 7
Candidate	Party	Votes	%
Irina Sidorina	United Russia	5,548	57.30%
Dmitry Sivokhin	A Just Russia — For Truth	1,184	12.23%
Mark Kvashnin	Liberal Democratic Party	790	8.16%
Ilya Zhuravlev	Communist Party	664	6.86%
Boris Dubov	Party of Pensioners	593	6.12%
Aleksey Zhuravlev	Communists of Russia	557	5.75%
Total		9,683	100%

==== District 8 ====
Summary of the 8–10 September 2023 Ivanovo Oblast Duma election in District 8
Candidate	Party	Votes	%
Sergey Rusinov	United Russia	5,203	62.18%
Dmitry Shevyrin	Communist Party	1,081	12.92%
Aleksey Pereletov	Liberal Democratic Party	588	7.03%
Natalya Dmitriyeva	Party of Pensioners	533	6.37%
Aleksey Fedulov	Communists of Russia	341	4.08%
Aleksandr Morozov	A Just Russia — For Truth	335	4.00%
Total		8,367	100%

==== District 9 ====
Summary of the 8–10 September 2023 Ivanovo Oblast Duma election in District 9
Candidate	Party	Votes	%
Viktor Toropov (incumbent)	United Russia	5,215	56.53%
Irina Korystyleva	Communist Party	1,233	13.36%
Dmitry Promzelev	Liberal Democratic Party	962	10.43%
Mikhail Vinogradov	Communists of Russia	741	8.03%
Viktor Diomidov	A Just Russia — For Truth	620	6.72%
Total		9,226	100%

==== District 10 ====
Summary of the 8–10 September 2023 Ivanovo Oblast Duma election in District 10
Candidate	Party	Votes	%
Sergey Baranov (incumbent)	United Russia	4,791	49.63%
Vasily Portnoy	Liberal Democratic Party	2,188	22.66%
Valentin Platonov	Communist Party	810	8.39%
Mikhail Dorofeyev	A Just Russia — For Truth	754	7.81%
Olga Lazareva	Communists of Russia	661	6.85%
Total		9,654	100%

==== District 11 ====
Summary of the 8–10 September 2023 Ivanovo Oblast Duma election in District 11
Candidate	Party	Votes	%
Vladimir Grishin (incumbent)	United Russia	13,027	68.15%
Sergey Klyuyev	Liberal Democratic Party	2,923	15.29%
Galina Golikova	Party of Pensioners	1,231	6.44%
Anatoly Timonin	Communists of Russia	1,054	5.51%
Eduard Allerborn	A Just Russia — For Truth	433	2.27%
Total		19,114	100%

==== District 12 ====
Summary of the 8–10 September 2023 Ivanovo Oblast Duma election in District 12
Candidate	Party	Votes	%
Anatoly Burov (incumbent)	United Russia	10,909	76.06%
Aleksandr Korovin	Communist Party	1,516	10.57%
Stanislav Nurzhanov	Liberal Democratic Party	708	4.94%
Ilya Dementyev	A Just Russia — For Truth	551	3.84%
Nikolay Kuligin	Communists of Russia	292	2.04%
Total		14,342	100%

==== District 13 ====
Summary of the 8–10 September 2023 Ivanovo Oblast Duma election in District 13
Candidate	Party	Votes	%
Aleksey Fedyashin	United Russia	7,317	64.72%
Mikhail Varentsov	Communist Party	1,341	11.86%
Dmitry Mastrakov	Liberal Democratic Party	667	5.90%
Valery Boyarkov	Party of Pensioners	446	3.94%
Aleksey Bodyagin	New People	440	3.89%
Mikhail Varentsov	Communists of Russia	415	3.67%
Pavel Popov	A Just Russia — For Truth	261	2.31%
Elshan Shabiyev	Independent	165	1.46%
Total		11,306	100%

==== District 14 ====
Summary of the 8–10 September 2023 Ivanovo Oblast Duma election in District 14
Candidate	Party	Votes	%
Sergey Mazalov (incumbent)	United Russia	13,055	73.37%
Vyacheslav Kasatkin	Communist Party	1,460	8.21%
Yevgeny Krylov	Communists of Russia	977	5.49%
Natalya Sorokina	New People	661	3.71%
Yekaterina Musina	Liberal Democratic Party	644	3.62%
Dmitry Lakeyev	A Just Russia — For Truth	555	3.12%
Total		17,794	100%

==== District 15 ====
Summary of the 8–10 September 2023 Ivanovo Oblast Duma election in District 15
Candidate	Party	Votes	%
Aleksandr Fomin (incumbent)	United Russia	7,703	68.56%
Nikolay Aleksandrov	Communist Party	1,270	11.30%
Valery Sokolov	Party of Pensioners	591	5.26%
Tatyana Sokolova	Liberal Democratic Party	586	5.22%
Olga Koltsova	Communists of Russia	442	3.93%
Yelena Gavrilova	A Just Russia — For Truth	358	3.19%
Total		11,236	100%

==== District 16 ====
Summary of the 8–10 September 2023 Ivanovo Oblast Duma election in District 16
Candidate	Party	Votes	%
Anzhelika Gataulina	United Russia	6,687	57.25%
Denis Fomichev	Liberal Democratic Party	2,435	20.85%
Aleksandr Orekhov	Communists of Russia	1,337	11.45%
Aleksandr Lyubimov	Party of Pensioners	336	2.88%
Sergey Lyubimov	A Just Russia — For Truth	331	2.83%
Vyacheslav Bryksin	New People	246	2.11%
Total		11,681	100%

==== District 17 ====
Summary of the 8–10 September 2023 Ivanovo Oblast Duma election in District 17
Candidate	Party	Votes	%
Denis Mayorov	United Russia	9,969	66.56%
Anatoly Timokhin	Communist Party	2,094	13.98%
Mikhail Kochetov	Liberal Democratic Party	1,094	7.30%
Timur Kuznetsov	New People	912	6.09%
Vyacheslav Bulavintsev	A Just Russia — For Truth	570	3.81%
Total		14,977	100%

==== District 18 ====
Summary of the 8–10 September 2023 Ivanovo Oblast Duma election in District 18
Candidate	Party	Votes	%
Dmitry Klyucharev	United Russia	10,435	68.31%
Pavel Smirnov (incumbent)	Communist Party	2,185	14.30%
Aleksandr Smirnov	Communists of Russia	740	4.84%
Maksim Naymushin	Liberal Democratic Party	506	3.31%
Valentina Sukhareva	Party of Pensioners	360	2.36%
Aleksey Smirnov	Independent	353	2.31%
Viktor Pismensky	A Just Russia — For Truth	328	2.15%
Total		15,275	100%

==== District 19 ====
Summary of the 8–10 September 2023 Ivanovo Oblast Duma election in District 19
Candidate	Party	Votes	%
Olga Guseva	United Russia	12,735	78.06%
Dmitry Denisenkov	Liberal Democratic Party	1,237	7.58%
Stanislav Mishin	Communist Party	664	4.07%
Andrey Gradusov	Party of Pensioners	477	2.92%
Anatoly Kuvshinov	Communists of Russia	381	2.34%
Anna Yakunina	New People	368	2.26%
Aleksandr Rakushev	A Just Russia — For Truth	222	1.36%
Total		16,315	100%

==== District 20 ====
Summary of the 8–10 September 2023 Ivanovo Oblast Duma election in District 20
Candidate	Party	Votes	%
Marina Dmitriyeva	United Russia	17,811	79.07%
Kirill Solovyev	Communist Party	1,551	6.89%
Artyom Kondratyev	Liberal Democratic Party	1,271	5.64%
Natalia Zatanaychenko	Communists of Russia	897	3.98%
Stepan Perzhola	A Just Russia — For Truth	568	2.52%
Total		22,525	100%

== See also ==
- 2023 Russian regional elections
