= 2023 Ivanovo Oblast gubernatorial election =

- 8–10 September 2023
- Turnout: 33.87%
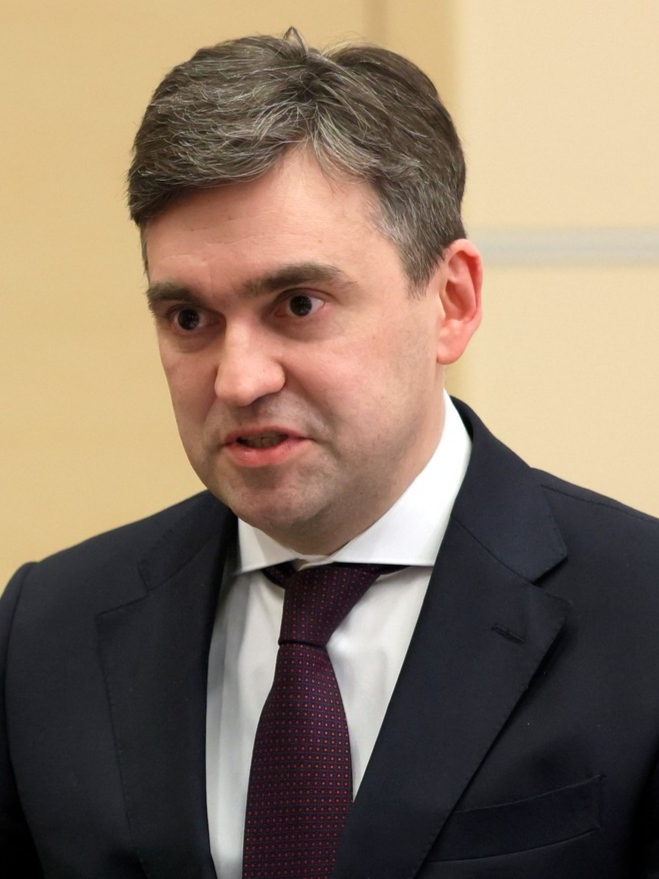
		CPRF
Candidate	Stanislav Voskresensky	Aleksandr Boykov
Party	United Russia	CPRF
Popular vote	215,478	16,777
Percentage	82.49%	6.42%
Governor before election
Stanislav Voskresensky
United Russia
Governor-elect
Stanislav Voskresensky
United Russia

The 2023 Ivanovo Oblast gubernatorial election took place on 8–10 September 2023, on common election day, coinciding with the Ivanovo Oblast Duma election. Incumbent Governor Stanislav Voskresensky was re-elected to a second term in office.

== Background ==
Stanislav Voskresensky, then–Deputy Minister of Economic Development of Russia, was appointed acting Governor of Ivanovo Oblast in October 2017, replacing previous first-term incumbent Pavel Konkov, who resigned at his own request. Voskresensky was nominated for the upcoming 2018 gubernatorial election by United Russia, despite not being a member of the party. He won the election with 65.72% of the vote. Despite Voskresensky's convincing victory, United Russia scored only 34.14% in the concurring Ivanovo Oblast Duma election and overall won a narrow 2–seat majority, which reaffirmed the general competitiveness of regional politics.

== Candidates ==
In Ivanovo Oblast candidates for Governor can be nominated only by registered political parties, self-nomination is not possible. However, candidates are not obliged to be members of the nominating party. Candidate for Governor of Ivanovo Oblast should be a Russian citizen and at least 30 years old. Candidates for Governor should not have a foreign citizenship or residence permit. Each candidate in order to be registered is required to collect at least 5% of signatures of members and heads of municipalities. Also gubernatorial candidates present 3 candidacies to the Federation Council and election winner later appoints one of the presented candidates.

=== Registered ===
- Aleksandr Boykov (CPRF), Member of Ivanovo Oblast Duma (2015–present)
- Aleksandr Orekhov (Communists of Russia), Member of Kineshma City Duma (2015–present), 2018 gubernatorial candidate
- Pavel Popov (SR–ZP), Member of Ivanovo Oblast Duma (2005–2013, 2018–present), 2018 gubernatorial candidate
- Dmitry Shelyakin (LDPR), Deputy Chairman of the Ivanovo Oblast Duma (2018–present), Member of Ivanovo Oblast Duma (2015–present), 2018 gubernatorial candidate
- Stanislav Voskresensky (United Russia), incumbent Governor of Ivanovo Oblast (2017–present)

=== Eliminated at United Russia convention ===
- Olga Buzulutskaya, Head of Komsomolsky District (2005–present)
- Valery Vasilyev, Senator from Ivanovo Oblast (2011–present)

=== Declined ===
- Viktor Bout (LDPR), convicted arms dealer
- Roman Lyabikhov (CPRF), Member of State Duma (2020–present)
- Svetlana Protasevich (CPRF), Ivanovo Oblast Duma staffer (appointed regional Commissioner for Children's Rights and left the party)

=== Candidates for Federation Council ===
Incumbent Senator Valery Vasilyev (United Russia) was not renominated.

- Stanislav Voskresensky (United Russia):
  - Vladimir Bulavin, former Head of Federal Customs Service of Russia (2016–2023)
  - Alexander Gusakovsky, Senator from Ivanovo Oblast (2021–present) (representing Ivanovo Oblast Duma)
  - Svetlana Protasevich, Ivanovo Oblast Commissioner for Children's Rights (2023–present)

== Polls ==
Fieldwork date	Polling firm	Voskresensky	Boykov	Shelyakin	Popov	Orekhov	None	Lead
26 July – 3 August 2023	WCIOM	83%	8%	5%	3%	<1%	1%	76%

== Results ==
Summary of the 8–10 September 2023 Ivanovo Oblast gubernatorial election results
Candidate	Party	Votes	%
Stanislav Voskresensky (incumbent)	United Russia	215,478	82.49
Aleksandr Boykov	Communist Party	16,777	6.42
Dmitry Shelyakin	Liberal Democratic Party	11,789	4.51
Pavel Popov	A Just Russia — For Truth	6,751	2.58
Aleksandr Orekhov	Communists of Russia	5,899	2.26
Valid votes		256,694	98.26
Blank ballots		4,537	1.74
Total		261,231	100.00
Turnout		261,231	33.87
Registered voters		771,230	100.00

Governor Voskresensky appointed former Federal Customs Service of Russia head Vladimir Bulavin (Independent) to the Federation Council, replacing incumbent Valery Vasilyev (United Russia).

== See also ==
- 2023 Russian regional elections
