= Government of Ivanovo Oblast =

- Polity type: Regional government
- Constitution: Constitution of Russia Charter of Ivanovo Oblast

Legislative branch
- Name: Ivanovo Oblast Duma
- Type: Unicameralism
- Meeting place: Ivanovo
- Presiding officer: Dmitrieva Marina Avenirovna, Chairman of Ivanovo Oblast Duma

Executive branch
- Head of state and government
- Title: Governor
- Currently: Stanislav Voskresensky

As with the federal government of Russia Ivanovo Oblast government is also divided into three branches: executive, legislative and judicial. The Charter of Ivanovo Oblast form the provincial law.

== Composition of the government ==
Government of Ivanovo Oblast
Post	Office holder
Governor	Stanislav Voskresensky
Deputy Chairman of the Government, Head of the Complex of Economic Development of the Ivanovo Region	Dmitrieva Lyudmila Vladislavovna
Deputy Chairman of the Government of the Ivanovo Region, Head of the Infrastructure Development Complex of the Ivanovo Region	Zobnin Sergey Vitalevich
Deputy Chairman of the Government of the Ivanovo Region, Head of the Construction Complex of the Ivanovo Region	Korobkin Sergey Mikhailovich
Deputy Chairman of the Government of the Ivanovo Region, Director of the Department of Internal Policy of the Ivanovo Region	Nesterov Evgeny Leonidovich
Chief of Staff of the Government of the Ivanovo Region	Khasbulatova Olga Anatolyevna
Head of the Property Management and Procurement Complex of the Ivanovo Region	Shabanova Elena Vladimirovna
Head of the Housing and Public Utilities and Energy Complex of the Ivanovo Region	Shabotinsky Alexander Leonidovich
Head of the Complex of the Social Sphere of the Ivanovo Region	Ermish Irina Gennadievna
Director of the Finance Department of the Ivanovo Region	Yakovleva Lyubov Vasilyevna
Director of the Department of Economic Development and Trade of the Ivanovo Region	Badak Lyudmila Sergeevna
Director of the Ivanovo Region Health Department	Sim Michael Illarionovich
Director of the Department of Culture and Tourism of the Ivanovo Region	Trofimova Natalya Vladimirovna
Director of the Department of Agriculture and Food of the Ivanovo Region	Cherkesov Denis Leonidovich

== Government Session ==
Government Session of Ivanovo Oblast
Session	Agenda
April 17,2019	On measures to stimulate fertility in the Ivanovo Oblast
April 3, 2019	On the transition to digital terrestrial television broadcasting and the disconnection of analog broadcasting in the territory of the Ivanovo Oblast
February 6, 2019	On the implementation of the road safety improvement program “10 routes” in 2019
January 16, 2019	On the results of the activities of the Construction Complex of the Ivanovo Region in 2018 and the tasks for 2019
December 5, 2018	On the results of the work of the road fund of the Ivanovo region in 2018 and the main approaches to the work of the fund in 2019

== Government Office ==
=== Structural units ===
- General Legal Department
- Department of Civil Service and Personnel
- Control management
- Documentation Management Department
- Anti Corruption Authority
- Office of Budget Planning and Accounting
- Regional Security Administration
- Protocol Management
- Logistics Management
- Office of the press service
- Department of Coordination of the Infrastructure Development Complex
- Coordination Department of the Social Sphere Complex
- Department of Coordination of the Complex of Economic Development
- Coordination Office of the Construction Complex
- Department of Coordination of the Complex of Housing and Public Utilities and Energy
- Management of Coordination of the Property Management and Procurement Complex
- Division to ensure the activities of the Commissioner for Human Rights
- Division to ensure the activities of the Governor
- Sector to ensure the activities of the Commissioner for the Protection of the Rights of Entrepreneurs
- Mobilization Department
- Department of Information Technology
- Public Procurement Division
- Sector of State Secret Protection and Special Documentary Communication
- Information Security Team
- Staff of Anti Terrorist Commission
- Office of the Situational Center of the Governor of the Ivanovo Oblast
- Representation of the Government of the Ivanovo Oblast in Moscow City

== See also ==
- Ivanovo Oblast
- Charter of Ivanovo Oblast
- Ivanovo Oblast Duma
