= 2023 Russian elections =

- 10 September 2023
- Gubernatorial Gubernatorial and legislative Legislative Two legislative elections (including one of another subject)

The 2023 Russian elections took place in Russia on Sunday, 10 September 2023 (single election day), with several regions allowing voting on 8 and 9 September. There were three by-elections to the 8th State Duma, 22 gubernatorial elections (21 direct and one indirectly elected), 16 regional parliamentary elections, and many elections on the municipal and local level.

== Campaign ==
The election campaign was muted, with the major opposition figures having fled the country or being imprisoned.

The Golos election monitor called the election campaign the "most meaningless, boring and invisible campaign in the modern history of Russia", with the elections being held with a lack of competition and discussion of social issues important to the regions, as well as the candidates for office themselves not showing any interest for voting; it also stated that the elections in regions for governorships were "practically invisible not only to voters, but also to long-term observers". In Oryol Oblast, where gubernatorial elections were being held, there was practically no campaign, with only one candidate from New People coming to the debate; in Samara Oblast, only the LDPR candidate came to the debate. Golos also noted that the opposition candidates in the gubernatorial elections did not have large campaigns, did not hold public meetings with voters, and had small electoral budgets, with some candidates only running their campaign on social networks. BBC News Russian mentioned that the brightest campaign was held in Khakassia, where both the head of the republic and deputies of the local parliament were elected at the same time, with the United Russia candidate, Sergey Sokol, running against the incumbent governor Valentin Konovalov from the Communist Party. Sokol presented himself as a war hero, but ran a less active campaign compared to Konovalov and was still perceived as a newcomer in the region, according to RBK, which projected that Konovalov would likely win in the first round. On 2 September, Sokol withdrew, citing health problems.

- Yabloko: The longtime liberal, pro-western opposition party Yabloko ran with the campaign slogan of "For Peace!" and ran 216 candidates throughout the country. Nikolay Rybakov, the party's chairman, stated that "there are several dozen parties in Russia that support the policies of President Putin. And there is only one party—Yabloko—which opposes his policies.” However, Yabloko individually didn't go as far as to directly call for peace due to Article 207.3 of the Criminal Code of Russia allowing the arrest of any Russian discrediting the military and its actions. Yabloko party officials, candidates and supporters were harassed by government officials throughout the campaign. Rybakov was declared a "foreign agent" and the Pskov branch of the party had its headquarters raided after its leader, Lev Shlosberg, who was also declared a "foreign agent", refused to call the Freedom of Russia Legion a "terrorist organization". Russian police also seized and destroyed all campaign material of the Novgorod Oblast branch of the party. Various Yabloko candidates, including Elizaveta Kazantseva, a candidate for the Yekaterinburg City Duma received death threats to drop out of the race.

== Conduct ==
The Golos election monitor said that it had received almost 600 complaints of violations as of the afternoon on the first day of voting, with threats of violence, vote buying and people being barred from casting ballots being among the most common complaints. It also said it had filed 75 complaints with authorities and received official responses in 28 cases.

== Federal elections ==
=== State Duma by-elections ===
Constituency	Former MP	Party	Elected MP	Party
Lipetsk	Nikolay Bortsov until 23 April 2023	United Russia	Dmitry Averov	United Russia
Karachay-Cherkessia	Dzhasharbek Uzdenov until 23 April 2023	United Russia	Soltan Uzdenov	United Russia
Divnogorsk	Viktor Zubarev until 31 May 2023	United Russia	Sergey Yeryomin	United Russia

== Regional elections ==
=== Gubernatorial direct elections ===
Region	Incumbent	Status	Last race	Result
Khakassia	Valentin Konovalov (CPRF)	Incumbent Head re-elected	2018: 57.57%	2023: 63.14%
Yakutia	Aysen Nikolayev (UR)	Incumbent Head re-elected	2018: 71.40%	2023: 75.77%
Altai Krai	Viktor Tomenko (UR)	Incumbent governor re-elected	2018: 53.61%	2023: 76.16%
Krasnoyarsk Krai	Aleksandr Uss (UR)	Resigned	2018: 60.19%	—
Krasnoyarsk Krai	Mikhail Kotyukov (UR)	Acting Governor elected	—	2023: 70.21%
Primorsky Krai	Oleg Kozhemyako (UR)	Incumbent governor re-elected	2018: 61.88%	2023: 72.78%
Amur Oblast	Vasily Orlov (UR)	Incumbent governor re-elected	2018: 55.60%	2023: 82.38%
Ivanovo Oblast	Stanislav Voskresensky (UR)	Incumbent governor re-elected	2018: 65.72%	2023: 82.49%
Kemerovo Oblast	Sergey Tsivilyov (UR)	Incumbent governor re-elected	2018: 81.29%	2023: 85.23%
Magadan Oblast	Sergey Nosov (UR)	Incumbent governor re-elected	2018: 81.59%	2023: 72.51%
Moscow Oblast	Andrey Vorobyov (UR)	Incumbent governor re-elected	2018: 62.52%	2023: 83.67%
Nizhny Novgorod Oblast	Gleb Nikitin (UR)	Incumbent governor re-elected	2018: 67.75%	2023: 82.82%
Novosibirsk Oblast	Andrey Travnikov (UR)	Incumbent governor re-elected	2018: 64.52%	2023: 75.72%
Omsk Oblast	Alexander Burkov (SR-ZP)	Resigned	2018: 83.56%	—
Omsk Oblast	Vitaliy Khotsenko (UR)	Acting Governor elected	—	2023: 76.33%
Oryol Oblast	Andrey Klychkov (CPRF)	Incumbent governor re-elected	2018: 83.55%	2023: 82.09%
Pskov Oblast	Mikhail Vedernikov (UR)	Incumbent governor re-elected	2018: 70.68%	2023: 86.30%
Samara Oblast	Dmitry Azarov (UR)	Incumbent governor re-elected	2018: 72.63%	2023: 83.82%
Smolensk Oblast	Alexey Ostrovsky (LDPR)	Resigned	2020: 56.54%	—
Smolensk Oblast	Vasily Anokhin (UR)	Acting Governor elected	—	2023: 86.62%
Tyumen Oblast	Aleksandr Moor (UR)	Incumbent governor re-elected	2018: 65.86%	2023: 78.77%
Voronezh Oblast	Aleksandr Gusev (UR)	Incumbent governor re-elected	2018: 72.52%	2023: 76.83%
Moscow	Sergey Sobyanin (UR)	Incumbent mayor re-elected	2018: 70.17%	2023: 76.85%
Chukotka AO	Roman Kopin (UR)	Resigned	2018: 57.83%	—
Chukotka AO	Vladislav Kuznetsov (UR)	Acting Governor elected	—	2023: 72.34%

=== Gubernatorial indirect elections ===
Region	Incumbent	Status	Last race	Result
Yamalo-Nenets AO	Dmitry Artyukhov (UR)	Incumbent re-elected	2018: 14/18	Dmitry Artyukhov 17 / 21

=== Legislative elections ===
Legislature	Seats	Voting system	Majority in last election		Majority after election	
State Assembly of Bashkortostan	110	Parallel (55 party list + 55 SMC)	United Russia	79 / 110	United Russia	87 / 110
People's Khural of Buryatia	66	Parallel (33 party list + 33 SMC)	United Russia	39 / 66	United Russia	51 / 66
People's Khural of Kalmykia	27	Parallel (10 party list + 17 SMC)	United Russia	21 / 27	United Russia	23 / 27
Supreme Council of Khakassia	50	Parallel (25 party list + 25 SMC)	United Russia	17 / 50	United Russia	34 / 50
State Assembly of the Sakha Republic	70	Parallel (35 party list + 35 SMC)	United Russia	47 / 70	United Russia	55 / 70
Legislative Assembly of Zabaykalsky Krai	50	Parallel (25 party list + 25 SMC)	United Russia	21 / 50	United Russia	42 / 50
Arkhangelsk Oblast Assembly of Deputies	47	Parallel (23 party list + 24 SMC)	United Russia	25 / 47	United Russia	36 / 47
Legislative Assembly of Irkutsk Oblast	42	Parallel (22 party list + 20 SMC)	CPRF	18 / 45	United Russia	35 / 45
Ivanovo Oblast Duma	30	Parallel (10 party list + 20 SMC)	United Russia	15 / 26	United Russia	27 / 30
Legislative Assembly of Kemerovo Oblast	46	Parallel (23 party list + 23 SMC)	United Russia	39 / 46	United Russia	40 / 46
Legislative Assembly of Rostov Oblast	60	Parallel (20 party list + 40 SMC)	United Russia	46 / 60	United Russia	54 / 60
Smolensk Oblast Duma	48	Parallel (16 party list + 32 SMC)	United Russia	26 / 48	United Russia	41 / 48
Legislative Assembly of Ulyanovsk Oblast	36	Parallel (18 party list + 18 SMC)	United Russia	17 / 36	United Russia	27 / 36
Legislative Assembly of Vladimir Oblast	40	Parallel (15 party list + 25 SMC)	United Russia	23 / 38	United Russia	35 / 40
Yaroslavl Oblast Duma	46	Parallel (12 party list + 34 SMC)	United Russia	32 / 50	United Russia	38 / 46
Assembly of Deputies of Nenets AO	19	Parallel (11 party list + 8 SMC)	United Russia	11 / 19	United Russia	13 / 19

=== Legislative by-elections ===
Constituency		Incumbent		This Race	
Legislature	No	Former member	Party	Results	Candidates
Altai Krai Legislative Assembly	5	Pyotr Tyutyunnikov	Communist Party	Incumbent died July 6, 2022, after long illness New member elected January 29, 2023; United Russia gain	▌ ✓ Dmitry Belyayev (United Russia) 64.1%; ▌ Sergey Sergiyenkov (CPRF) 15.8%; ▌ Vyacheslav Aksenov (SR–ZP) 8.5%; ▌ Viktor Zatonskikh (LDPR) 5.2%; ▌ Yevgeny Vegera (CPCR) 4.5%
Kostroma Oblast Duma	10	Maksim Guterman	Yabloko	Incumbent resigned June 16, 2022; New member elected April 23, 2023; United Russia gain	▌ ✓ Ivan Bryukhanov (United Russia) 74.1%; ▌ Marina Koldanova (CPRF) 9.3%; ▌ Ivan Saburov (LDPR) 7.6%; ▌ Olga Smirnova (SR–ZP) 5.5%; ▌ Andrey Tarasov (RPPSS) 2.2%
State Assembly of the Mari El Republic	33	Yevgeny Kuzmin	United Russia	Incumbent resigned June 30, 2022, to become First Deputy Chairman of the Government of Mari El; New member elected April 23, 2023; United Russia hold	▌ ✓ Yury Ignatyev (United Russia) 80.7%; ▌ Elvira Mikhaylova (CPRF) 7.7%; ▌ Igor Yakovlev (SR–ZP) 6.1%; ▌ Yevgeny Koskin (LDPR) 3.0%; ▌ Yekaterina Sankevich (Independent) 1.1%
State Council of the Republic of Tatarstan	20	Oleg Korobchenko	Party of Growth	Incumbent resigned May 30, 2022, to become Deputy Prime Minister of Tatarstan – Minister of Industry and Trade; New member elected May 28, 2023; Party of Growth hold	▌ ✓ Ruslan Nigmatulin (Party of Growth) 74.4%; ▌ Tatyana Mukhina (CPRF) 6.9%; ▌ Adel Vakhitov (LDPR) 4.8%; ▌ Aleksandr Bykov (New People) 4.5%; ▌ Ilnar Sirayev (SR–ZP) 4.2%; ▌ Irek Ziyatdinov (Independent) 2.5%
Bryansk Oblast Duma	3	Konstantin Vorontsov	United Russia	Incumbent resigned July 26, 2022, after being indicted for taking bribes New member elected June 25, 2023; United Russia hold	▌ ✓ Yevgeny Kiselev (United Russia) 73.5%; ▌ Aleksey Timoshkov (SR–ZP) 13.1%; ▌ Dmitry Gusev (LDPR) 11.7%
Kostroma Oblast Duma	13	Flun Gumerov	United Russia	Incumbent resigned September 15, 2022; New member elected September 10, 2023; United Russia hold	▌ ✓ Vladimir Baldin (United Russia) 54.9%; ▌ Andrey Tarasov (CPRF) 21.2%; ▌ Yury Mindolin (LDPR) 8.2%; ▌ Tatyana Smirnova (SR–ZP) 7.8%; ▌ Andrey Tarasov (RPPSS) 5.3%
Legislative Assembly of Sverdlovsk Oblast	13	Viktor Sheptiy	United Russia	Incumbent resigned September 20, 2022, to become Senator of the Federation Council; New member elected September 10, 2023; United Russia hold	▌ ✓ Aleksey Korobeynikov (United Russia) 60.7%; ▌Oleg Fominykh (SR–ZP) 16.1%; ▌ Nikolay Korobeynikov (CPRF) 9.1%; ▌ Mikhail Semeykin (LDPR) 7.1%; ▌ Yegor Maksimov (New People) 4.5%
Tyumen Oblast Duma	20	Sergey Romanov	United Russia	Incumbent resigned September 23, 2022; New member elected September 10, 2023; United Russia hold	▌ ✓ Nikolay Savchenko (United Russia) 44.5%; ▌ Aleksandr Zhukov (CPRF) 20.5%; ▌ Ruslan Sabirov (LDPR) 13.6%; ▌ Ivan Mashchenko (CPCR) 8.9%; ▌ Georgy Ergemlidze (SR–ZP) 5.4%
Legislative Assembly of Kirov Oblast	9	Vladimir Kostin	Liberal Democratic Party	Incumbent resigned October 6, 2022, to become First Deputy Chief of Staff to the Head of the Udmurt Republic; New member elected September 10, 2023; United Russia gain	▌ ✓ Aleksandr Chilikin (United Russia) 54.7%; ▌ Mikhail Skopin (LDPR) 17.4%; ▌ Aleksandr Vorozhtsov (CPRF) 13.0%; ▌ Sergey Postnikov (SR–ZP) 7.4%; ▌ Andrey Solodyankin (RPPSS) 4.8%
Sakhalin Oblast Duma	5	Andrey Khapochkin	United Russia	Incumbent resigned October 6, 2022, to become Senator of the Federation Council; New member elected September 10, 2023; United Russia hold	▌ ✓ Nikolay Artyomenko (United Russia) 74.6%; ▌ Kristina Anisimova (CPRF) 9.2%; ▌ Yelena Abramova (SR–ZP) 3.5%; ▌ Lyaysan Makhiyanova (New People) 3.2%; ▌ Olga Klimova (RPPSS) 2.9%; ▌ Yelena Pestunova (CPCR) 2.3%; ▌ Yelena Kozhurina (LDPR) 2.2%; ▌ Yelena Misnik (Rodina) 0.3%
State Assembly of the Republic of Mordovia	16	Vladimir Gribanov	United Russia	Incumbent resigned October 7, 2022, after being indicted for bank records falsification New member elected September 10, 2023; United Russia hold	▌ ✓ Dmitry Glushko (United Russia) 67.6%; ▌ Irina Koroleva (LDPR) 11.8%; ▌ Mikhail Malygin (CPRF) 9.6%; ▌ Roman Pivkin (SR–ZP) 7.0%
Legislative Assembly of Krasnoyarsk Krai	12	Sergey Popov	United Russia	Incumbent resigned November 24, 2022; New member elected September 10, 2023; United Russia hold	▌ ✓ Aleksey Tumanin (United Russia) 59.4%; ▌ Ivan Serebryakov (Rodina) 10.4%; ▌ Madina Chevychalova (CPRF) 8.4%; ▌ Nina Kalinina (LDPR) 6.9%; ▌ Igor Bolbat (RPPSS) 5.5%; ▌ Ksenia Kadakina (SR–ZP) 5.4%
Duma of Stavropol Krai	13	Artur Nasonov	United Russia	Incumbent resigned January 9, 2023; New member elected September 10, 2023; United Russia hold	▌ ✓ Oleg Petrovsky (United Russia) 63.3%; ▌ Nadezhda Piltenko (LDPR) 15.9%; ▌ Ramazan Batchayev (CPRF) 14.8%; ▌ Nikolay Shchipachyov (SR–ZP) 2.5%; ▌ Viktoria Kuchina (Independent) 2.1%
Tyumen Oblast Duma	19	Nikolay Russu	United Russia	Incumbent resigned February 2, 2023; New member elected September 10, 2023; United Russia hold	▌ ✓ Andrey Lazarev (United Russia) 46.4%; ▌ Stanislav Zykov (LDPR) 15.0%; ▌ Sergey Morev (SR–ZP) 12.4%; ▌ Aleksandr Melnikov (CPRF) 11.9%; ▌ Andrey Afanasyev (CPCR) 10.5%
Legislative Assembly of Perm Krai	17	Anton Udalyev	United Russia	Incumbent resigned February 16, 2023, to be appointed Deputy Director of Moscow Department of Housing Utilities; New member elected September 10, 2023; United Russia hold	▌ ✓ Albert Demchenko (United Russia) 55.9%; ▌ Irina Shabarshina (SR–ZP) 23.2%; ▌ Georgy Balashov (LDPR) 10.0%; ▌ Marat Galimullin (CPRF) 7.0%
Moscow Oblast Duma	17	Sergey Babchenko	United Russia	Incumbent expelled February 16, 2023 for truancy New member elected September 10, 2023; Independent gain	▌ ✓ Mikhail Zhdan (Independent) 64.7%; ▌ Aleksandr Lifanov (CPRF) 10.8%; ▌ Eduard Perebikovsky (LDPR) 9.2%; ▌ Olga Privalova (SR–ZP) 7.2%; ▌ Kirill Yankov (Yabloko) 5.1%
Kursk Oblast Duma	15	Vyacheslav Fedyukin	United Russia	Incumbent died March 25, 2023; New member elected September 10, 2023; United Russia hold	▌ ✓ Aleksandr Uvakin (United Russia) 80.8%; ▌ Vadim Chelpanov (LDPR) 8.2%; ▌ Vladimir Kochnev (CPRF) 3.8%; ▌ Yelena Dolgushina (SR–ZP) 3.1%; ▌ Dmitry Markovchin (New People) 1.7%
Legislative Assembly of Leningrad Oblast	5	Aleksey Makhotin	United Russia	Incumbent resigned March 29, 2023, to join the Investigative Committee of Russia; New member elected September 10, 2023; United Russia hold	▌ ✓ Sergey Machinsky (United Russia) 69.3%; ▌ Yevgeny Verbitsky (CPRF) 15.4%; ▌ Larisa Lukina (New People) 5.1%; ▌ Armen Ananyan (SR–ZP) 4.8%; ▌ Anton Belonuchkin (LDPR) 3.00%
Ryazan Oblast Duma	10	Stanislav Podol	United Russia	Incumbent resigned April 12, 2023, after being convicted for lack of safety precautions leading to mass poisoning New member elected September 10, 2023; United Russia hold	▌ ✓ Vyacheslav Morozov (United Russia) 78.8%; ▌ Lilia Krivtsova (CPRF) 8.2%; ▌ Yevgeny Myasin (LDPR) 5.9%; ▌ Marina Tyurina (CPCR) 5.0%
Kurgan Oblast Duma	10	Boris Chepurnoy	United Russia	Incumbent resigned April 26, 2023; New member elected September 10, 2023; United Russia hold	▌ ✓ Aleksandr Chernyak (United Russia) 54.5%; ▌ Mikhail Deulin (CPRF) 28.1%; ▌ Alyona Kovrigina (LDPR) 13.8%
Belgorod Oblast Duma	12	Mikhail Nesvetaylo	United Russia	Incumbent resigned May 22, 2023; New member elected September 10, 2023; United Russia hold	▌ ✓ Zhanna Chefranova (United Russia) 74.1%; ▌ Nikolay Andreyev (CPRF) 13.8%; ▌ Maksim Malyutin (LDPR) 6.3%; ▌ Yevgeny Oblakov (SR–ZP) 4.0%
Legislative Assembly of Omsk Oblast	16	Vladimir Varnavsky	United Russia	Incumbent died May 23, 2023; New member elected September 10, 2023; United Russia hold	▌ ✓ Valery Boyko (United Russia) 65.1%; ▌ Aleksandr Snytkin (LDPR) 13.1%; ▌ Kirill Kuryatnikov (CPRF) 9.0%; ▌ Aleksey Zmaga (CPCR) 4.5%; ▌ Igor Sheremetyev (SR–ZP) 4.2%
Legislative Assembly of Primorsky Krai	21	Dmitry Nazarets	United Russia	Incumbent expelled July 26, 2023 for truancy New member elected October 29, 2023; United Russia hold	▌ ✓ Anton Voloshko (United Russia) 68.7%; ▌ Olga Sidorenko (CPRF) 12.6%; ▌ Andrey Fedotov (LDPR) 9.2%; ▌ Danil Samovidov (SR–ZP) 7.3%

== Municipal elections ==
=== Mayoral ===
City	Incumbent	Status	Last race	Results
Khabarovsk (Khabarovsk Krai)	Sergey Kravchuk (UR)	Incumbent re-elected	2018: 39.97%	▌ ✓ Sergey Kravchuk (inc.) (United Russia) 45.4%; ▌Mikhail Sidorov (SR–ZP) 33.2%; ▌Aleksandr Chuprov (CPRF) 9.9%; ▌Veniamin Stelmakh (New People) 5.0%; ▌Nikolay Singur (RPPSS) 1.8%; ▌Abdukhamid Saidov (Independent) 1.2%; ▌Viktor Rotar (Rodina) 1.0%

=== Municipal Councils ===
Municipal body	Seats	Voting system	Majority in last election		Majority after election	
Council of People's Deputies of Maykop (Adygea)	30	Parallel (20 party list + 10 SMC)	United Russia	20 / 30	United Russia	23 / 30
Council of Deputies of Abakan (Khakassia)	29	Parallel (15 party list + 14 SMC)	United Russia	17 / 29	United Russia	22 / 29
Yakutsk City Duma (Yakutia)	30	Parallel (15 party list + 15 SMC)	United Russia	17 / 30	United Russia	21 / 30
Krasnoyarsk City Council of Deputies (Krasnoyarsk Krai)	36	Parallel (18 party list + 18 SMC)	United Russia	17 / 36	United Russia	30 / 36
Arkhangelsk City Duma (Arkhangelsk Oblast)	30	Parallel (15 party list + 15 SMC)	United Russia	11 / 30	United Russia	23 / 30
Belgorod City Council (Belgorod Oblast)	39	Parallel (12 party list + 27 SMC)	United Russia	29 / 39	United Russia	33 / 39
Duma of Veliky Novgorod (Novgorod Oblast)	30	Parallel (10 party list + 20 SMC)	CPRF	12 / 30	United Russia	24 / 30
Ryazan City Duma (Ryazan Oblast)	40	Parallel (20 party list + 20 SMC)	United Russia	25 / 40	United Russia	34 / 40
Yekaterinburg City Duma (Sverdlovsk Oblast)	35	Parallel (10 party list + 25 SMC)	United Russia	19 / 36	United Russia	27 / 35
Tyumen City Duma (Tyumen Oblast)	36	Parallel (10 party list + 26 SMC)	United Russia	26 / 30	United Russia	28 / 36
Volgograd City Duma (Volgograd Oblast)	35	Parallel (10 party list + 25 SMC)	United Russia	30 / 36	United Russia	30 / 35

== See also ==
- 2023 elections in Russian-occupied Ukraine
