= Bochkov =

Bochkov (masculine, Russian: Бочков) or Bochkova (feminine, Russian: Бочкова) is a Russian surname. Notable people with the surname include:

- Aleksey Bochkov (1970–2015), Russian cyclist
- Andrei Bochkov (born 1982), Russian football player
- Nikita Bochkov (born 1991), Russian figure skater
- Rodion Bochkov (born 1993), Russian weightlifter
- Sergey Bochkov (born 1979), Azerbaijani triple jumper
- Vladimir Bochkov (1946–2022), Russian politician
