= Governor of Ivanovo Oblast =

Highest-ranking official in Ivanovo Oblast, Russia

- Coat of arms of Ivanovo Oblast

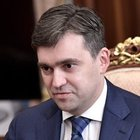
- Incumbent; Stanislav Voskresensky since 10 October 2018
- Residence: Ivanovo
- Nominator: Political parties
- Term length: 5 years
- Inaugural holder: Adolf Laptev
- Formation: 1991
- Website: ivanovoobl.ru

The governor of Ivanovo Oblast (Russian: Губернатор Ивановской области) is the highest official of Ivanovo Oblast, a region in Central Russia. He heads the government of Ivanovo Oblast and is elected by direct popular vote for the term of five years.

== History of office ==
Until the spring of 1990, the regional committees (obkom) of the Communist Party of the Soviet Union enjoyed the unlimited power over de iure institutions, such as regional Soviet and its executive committee (ispolkom). With the abolition of the Article 6 of the Soviet Constitution, which defined the "leading and guiding role" of the CPSU in country's politics, the chairman of the Soviet became the senior official in the region. Most of the regional party bosses began to be elected as speakers, until in the fall of 1990, the RSFSR authorities prohibited combining the posts of party and Soviet leader. Many of the first secretaries of the CPSU obkoms resigned from their party posts and focused on their work as speakers of the Soviets.

From 1990 to 1994, Vladislav Tikhomirov was the chairman of Ivanovo Oblast ispolkom. In March 1990, Tikhomirov was elected chairman of the Soviet, and on June 2, he succeeded Mikhail Knyazyuk as the first secretary of the CPSU regional committee. However, in August he left this position.

In late 1991, at the beginning of the radical reforms, the President of Russia Boris Yeltsin had virtually unlimited powers to form executive branch of the regions. He introduced the post of Head of Administration instead of chairmen of ispolkoms. So on 24 December 1991, 56-year-old Adolf Laptev was appointed head of administration of Ivanovo Oblast, previously worked as the first deputy chairman of Ivanovo Oblast ispolkom under Vladislav Tikhomirov.

In January 1996, Laptev resigned due to deteriorating health. Since February 1, Vladislav Tikhomirov was appointed head of administration, who was the chairman of the Legislative Assembly since 1994. On December 1, the first gubernatorial election took place in Ivanovo Oblast, which was won by Vladislav Tikhomirov. His term of office was four years. In the new Charter of Ivanovo Oblast, adopted in 2000, the terms of office of the governor and the legislature were extended to five years.

From 2005 to 2012 governor of Ivanovo Oblast, as well as heads of other Russian regions, was not elected by popular vote, but approved by Ivanovo Oblast Duma from the list of candidates proposed by president of Russia.

== List of officeholders ==
#	Portrait	Governor	Tenure	Time in office	Party	Election
1		Adolf Laptev (1935–2005)	24 December 1991 – 22 January 1996 (resigned)	4 years, 29 days	Independent	Appointed
2		Vladislav Tikhomirov (1939–2017)	1 February 1996 – 27 December 2000 (retired)	4 years, 330 days	Independent	Appointed 1996
3		Vladimir Tikhonov (born 1947)	27 December 2000 – 20 December 2005 (resigned)	4 years, 358 days	Communist Party → VKPBu	2000
—		Yury Tokayev	20 December 2005 – 23 December 2005	3 days	Independent	Acting
4		Mikhail Men (born 1960)	23 December 2005 – 16 October 2013 (resigned)	7 years, 295 days	United Russia	2005; 2010
—		Pavel Konkov (born 1958)	16 October 2013 – 19 September 2014	3 years, 359 days	United Russia	Acting
5		Pavel Konkov (born 1958)	19 September 2014 – 10 October 2017 (resigned)	3 years, 359 days	United Russia	2014
—		Stanislav Voskresensky (born 1976)	10 October 2017 – 10 October 2018	8 years, 332 days	United Russia	Acting
6		Stanislav Voskresensky (born 1976)	10 October 2018 – present	8 years, 332 days	United Russia	2018; 2023
