= Valery Vasilyev =

Valery Vasilyev may refer to:

- Valeri Vasiliev (1949–2012), Soviet and Russian ice hockey defenceman
- Valeri Vasilyev (born 1994), Russian ice hockey defenceman
- Valery Vasilyev (politician) (born 1965), Russian politician
