= Duma of Veliky Novgorod =

City duma of Veliky Novgorod, Russia

Duma of Veliky Novgorod Дума Великого Новгорода
- 6th legislature

Type
- Type: Unicameral

Leadership
- Chairman: Aleksey Mityunov, United Russia

Structure
- Seats: 30
- Political groups: Government (24): United Russia (24); Supporting (5): Communist Party (1); Liberal Democratic Party (1); A Just Russia (1); Party of Pensioners (1); New People (1); Opposition (1): Yabloko (1)

Elections
- Voting system: Mixed
- Last election: 8–10 September 2023
- Next election: 2028

Website
- duma.nov.ru

The Duma of Veliky Novgorod (Russian: Дума Великого Новгорода, romanized: Duma Velikogo Novgoroda) is the city duma of Veliky Novgorod, Russia. A total of 30 deputies are elected for five-year terms.

== Elections ==
=== 2023 ===
The results from the 2023 Russian elections are as follows:

Party	%	Seats
United Russia	41.29	24
Communist Party of the Russian Federation	14.27	1
A Just Russia	10.25	1
New People	9.81	1
Liberal Democratic Party of Russia	8.64	1
Yabloko	7.37	1
Russian Party of Pensioners for Social Justice	5.71	1
Registered voters/turnout	20.90	

=== 2018 ===
The results from the 2018 Russian elections are as follows:

Party	%	Seats
Communist Party of the Russian Federation	30.57	12
United Russia	24.39	8
A Just Russia	17.39	7
Liberal Democratic Party of Russia	12.49	2
Yabloko	11.08	1
Registered voters/turnout	24.09	
