= Alexander Gusakovsky =

Russian politician (born 1970)

- Александр Гусаковский

Senator from Ivanovo Oblast
- Incumbent
- Assumed office 15 October 2021
- Preceded by: Viktor Smirnov

Personal details
- Born: Alexander Gusakovsky; 25 August 1970 (age 56) Izhevsk, Russian Soviet Federative Socialist Republic, Soviet Union
- Party: United Russia
- Education: Saint Petersburg State Institute of Film and Television

Alexander Vladislavovich Gusakovsky (Russian: Александр Владиславович Гусаковский; born 25 August 1970) is a Russian politician serving as a senator from Ivanovo Oblast since 15 October 2021.

== Biography ==
Alexander Gusakovsky was born on 25 August 1970 in Izhevsk. In 1992, he graduated from the Saint Petersburg State Institute of Film and Television. Afterwards, he worked as an exhibition organizer. From 2001 to 2004, Gusakovsky was a commercial director of the art workshops in the village of Kholui, Ivanovo Oblast. In 2004, he was appointed commercial director of the company "Russian lacquer miniature". In 2007, he founded the LLC "Vozrozhdenie" Palekhskiye Masterskiye, specializing in icon painting, church painting, and lacquer miniature. On 13 September 2015, he was elected deputy of the Council of the Palekh urban settlement of the 3rd convocation. On 15 October 2021, Gusakovsky became the senator of the from the Ivanovo Oblast Duma.

Alexander Gusakovsky is under personal sanctions introduced by the European Union, the United Kingdom, the USA, Canada, Switzerland, Australia, Ukraine, New Zealand, for ratifying the decisions of the "Treaty of Friendship, Cooperation and Mutual Assistance between the Russian Federation and the Donetsk People's Republic and between the Russian Federation and the Luhansk People's Republic" and providing political and economic support for Russia's annexation of Ukrainian territories.
