= 2023 Ulyanovsk Oblast Legislative Assembly election =

- 8–10 September 2023
- Turnout: 34.65%
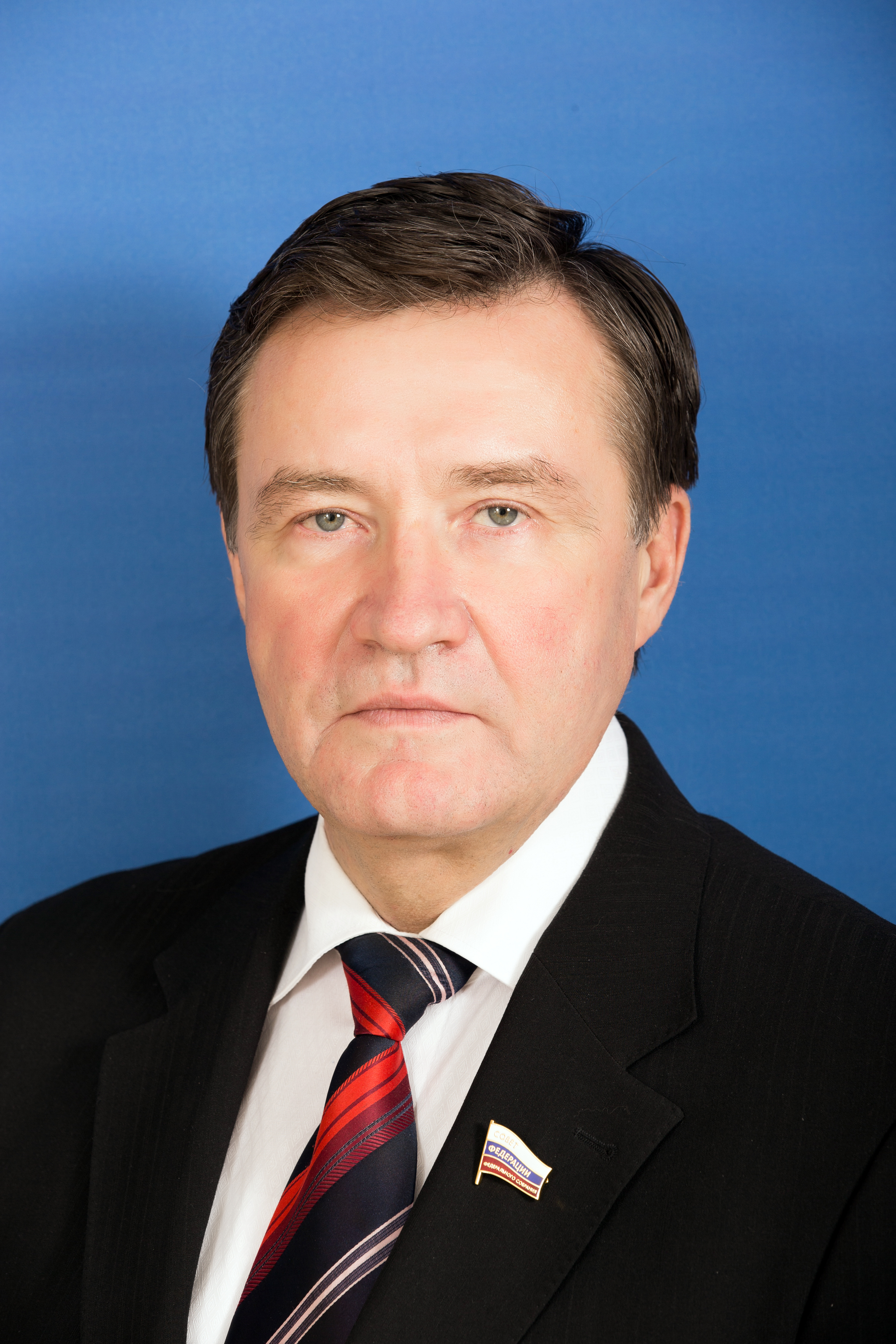

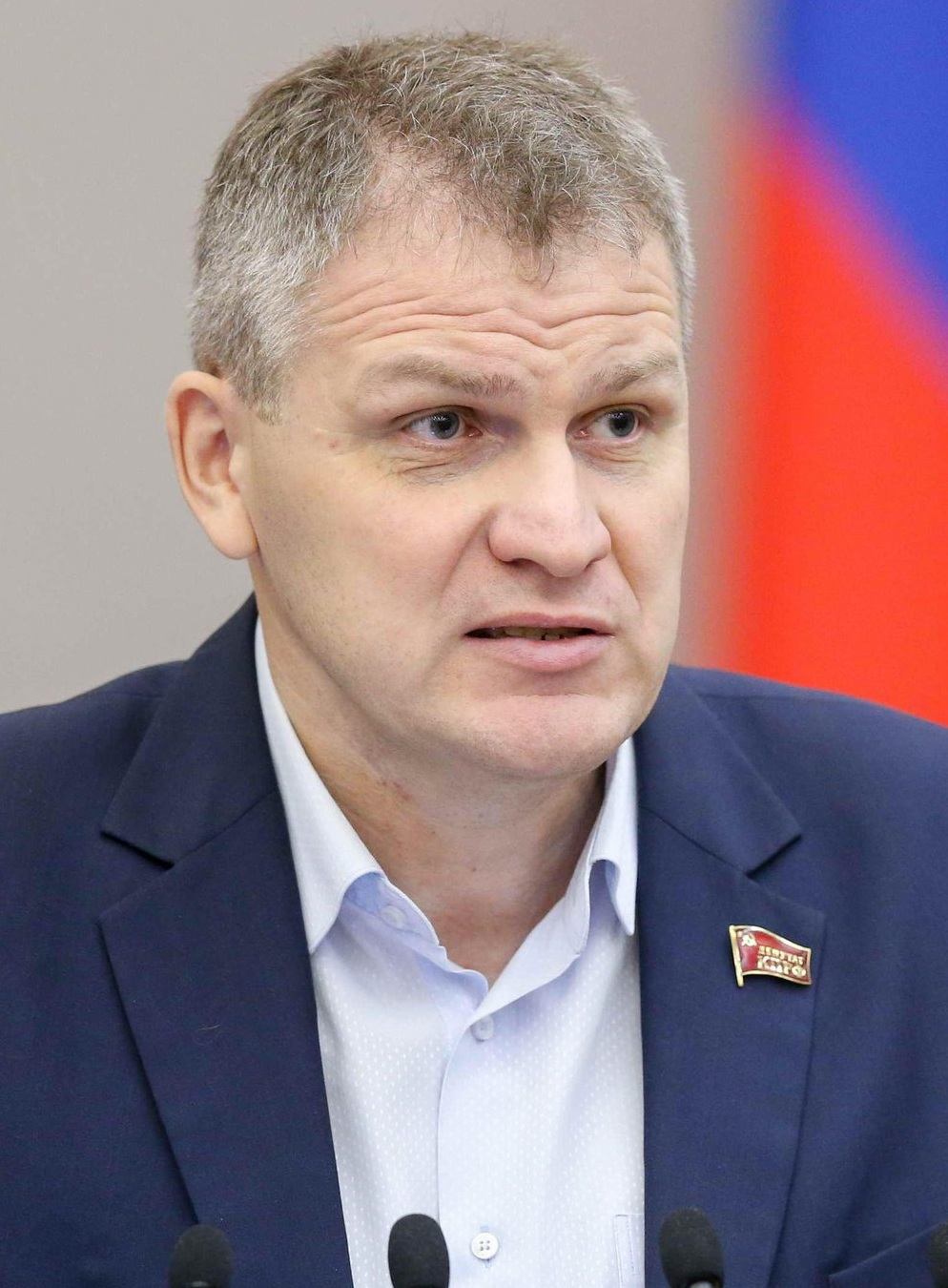

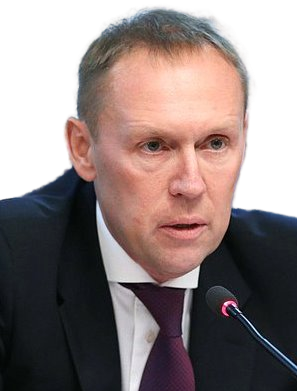
	Majority party	Minority party	Third party
Candidate	Sergey Ryabukhin	Alexey Kurinny	Andrey Lugovoy
Leader	Dmitry Medvedev	Gennady Zyuganov	Leonid Slutsky
Party	United Russia	CPRF	LDPR
Last election	17 seats, 33.96%	14 seats, 36.24%	4 seats, 13.51%
Seats won	27	3	3
Seat change	▲10	▼11	▼1
Popular vote	164,975	52,756	44,815
Percentage	49.91%	15.96%	13.56%
Swing	▲15.95%	▼20.28%	▲0.05%
	Fourth party	Fifth party	Sixth party
	CPCR	SR-ZP	NL
Candidate	Yaroslav Sidorov	Andrey Sedov	Yury Belousov
Leader	Sergey Malinkovich	Sergey Mironov	Aleksey Nechayev
Party	Communists of Russia	SR-ZP	New People
Last election	1 seat, 5.83%	0 seats, 3.93%	Did not exist
Seats won	1	1	0
Seat change	Steady	▲1	Did not exist
Popular vote	24,845	17,038	14,817
Percentage	7.52%	5.15%	4.48%
Swing	▲1.69%	▲1.22%	Did not exist

The 2023 Legislative Assembly of Ulyanovsk Oblast election took place on 8–10 September 2023, on common election day. All 36 seats in the Legislative Assembly were up for reelection.

== Electoral system ==
Under current election laws, the Legislative Assembly is elected for a term of five years, with parallel voting. 18 seats are elected by party-list proportional representation with a 5% electoral threshold, with the other half elected in 18 single-member constituencies by first-past-the-post voting. Seats in the proportional part are allocated using the Imperiali quota, modified to ensure that every party list, which passes the threshold, receives at least one mandate.

== Candidates ==
=== Party lists ===
To register regional lists of candidates, parties need to collect 0.5% of signatures of all registered voters in Ulyanovsk Oblast. Prior to the election oblast-wide part of party lists was abolished with only territorial groups retaining.

The following parties were relieved from the necessity to collect signatures:

- United Russia
- Communist Party of the Russian Federation
- A Just Russia — Patriots — For Truth
- Liberal Democratic Party of Russia
- New People
- Communists of Russia

No.	Party	Territorial groups' leaders	Candidates	Territorial groups	Status
1	Communists of Russia	Vyacheslav Vodyanov • Gennady Chigleyev • Maksim Ponizyaykin • Yevgeny Krasnov • Ivan Yargunkin • Vladimir Golikov • Artyom Titov • Igor Nikolayev • Yaroslav Sidorov • Yekaterina Karaush	29	10	Registered
2	United Russia	Sergey Ryabukhin • Maria Shpak • Vladimir Kameko • Aleksandr Chepukhin • Vyacheslav Bezrukov • Oleg Lobunets • Yury Kelin • Sergey Sherstnev • Sergey Panchin	27	9	Registered
3	A Just Russia – For Truth	Roman Goryachev • Svetlana Syrova • Tatyana Zhulnitova • Mikhail Vuyko • Oleg Manakovsky • Viktor Tarasov • Ilya Motayev • Natalya Lepeshkina • Rafael Byakhtygareyev • Yevgeny Buyarov • Andrey Sedov • Sergey Avdonichev • Grigory Matveyev • Sergey Borisov • Sergey Tupikin • Marina Tsvetkova • Nikolay Vasilyev	45	17	Registered
4	Communist Party	Vitaly Kuzin • Alexey Kurinny • Oleg Yedelkin • Andrey Ivanov • Roman Sultashov • Ramil Khakimov • Lyudmila Shishkina • Yelena Dolotova • Aleksandr Spitsyn • Yevgeny Vasin • Vadim Belov	31	11	Registered
5	Liberal Democratic Party	Nikolay Vazanov • Nikolay Kuzovenkov • Oleg Shurchalov • Yekaterina Orekhova • Dmitry Voronezhsky • Shamil Shaydullov • Igor Brazhkin • Vladislav Taymolkin • Ernest Staratelev • Victor Bout • Aleksey Medvedev • Aleksey Yarkov • Vladimir Koshelev • Andrey Funygin • Andrey Lugovoy	36	15	Registered
6	New People	Vladimir Sobolev • Natalya Kornilina • Anver Belkheyev • Yury Belousov • Vladimir Nikiforov • Andrey Konovalenko • Valentina Nikonova • Aleksandr Bragin • Konstantin Tolkachyov • Aleksandr Kaplin • Olga Svirid • Gleb Astashenkov • Albert Iskhakov	31	13	Registered
	Rodina				Failed the certification

New People will take part in Ulyanovsk Oblast legislative election for the first time. Patriots of Russia, who participated in the last election, had been dissolved prior, while Russian Party of Freedom and Justice and Civic Platform did not file.

=== Single-mandate constituencies ===
18 single-mandate constituencies were formed in Ulyanovsk Oblast. To register candidates in single-mandate constituencies need to collect 3% of signatures of registered voters in the constituency.

Number of candidates in single-mandate constituencies
Party	Candidates	
Party	Nominated	Registered
Communist Party	18	18
United Russia	18	18
Liberal Democratic Party	18	18
Communists of Russia	17	16
A Just Russia — For Truth	18	17
New People	10	9
Independent	1	1
Total	100	97

== Results ==
=== Results by party lists ===
Summary of the 8–10 September 2023 Legislative Assembly of Ulyanovsk Oblast election results
Party	Party list					Constituency		Total	
Party	Votes	%	±pp	Seats	+/–	Seats	+/–	Seats	+/–
United Russia	164,975	49.91	▲15.95%	11	▲4	16	▲6	27	▲10
Communist Party	52,756	15.96	▼20.28%	3	▼5	0	▼6	3	▼11
Liberal Democratic Party	44,815	13.56	▲0.05%	2	Steady	1	▼1	3	▼1
Communists of Russia	24,845	7.52	▲1.69%	1	Steady	0	Steady	1	Steady
A Just Russia — For Truth	17,038	5.15	▲1.22%	1	▲1	0	Steady	1	▲1
New People	14,817	4.48	New	0	New	0	New	0	New
Independents	–	–	–	–	–	1	▲1	1	▲1
Invalid ballots	11,296	3.42	▲0.28%	—	—	—	—	—	—
Total	330,543	100.00	—	18	Steady	18	Steady	36	Steady
Turnout	330,543	34.65	▼5.66%	—	—	—	—	—	—
Registered voters	953,970	100.00	—	—	—	—	—	—	—

Valery Malyshev (United Russia) was re-elected as Chairman of the Legislative Assembly, while incumbent Senator Sergey Ryabukhin (United Russia) was re-appointed to the Federation Council.

=== Results in single-member constituencies ===
==== District 1 ====
Summary of the 8–10 September 2023 Legislative Assembly of Ulyanovsk Oblast election in Karsunsky constituency 1
Candidate	Party	Votes	%
Valery Malyshev (incumbent)	United Russia	24,093	76.94%
Nikolay Vazanov	Liberal Democratic Party	2,012	6.42%
Ivan Yefimov	Communist Party	1,879	6.00%
Roman Goryachev	A Just Russia – For Truth	1,557	4.97%
Vyacheslav Vodyanov	Communists of Russia	1,235	3.94%
Total		31,316	100%

==== District 2 ====
Summary of the 8–10 September 2023 Legislative Assembly of Ulyanovsk Oblast election in Veshkaymsky constituency 2
Candidate	Party	Votes	%
Shamil Shaydullin	United Russia	11,100	53.55%
Aleksandr Koshlin	Communist Party	4,010	19.35%
Svetlana Syrova	A Just Russia – For Truth	1,878	9.06%
Aleksandr Petrov	Communists of Russia	1,560	7.53%
Nikolay Kuzovenkov	Liberal Democratic Party	1,340	6.46%
Total		20,728	100%

==== District 3 ====
Summary of the 8–10 September 2023 Legislative Assembly of Ulyanovsk Oblast election in Baryshsky constituency 3
Candidate	Party	Votes	%
Konstantin Dolgov	United Russia	18,116	73.75%
Nikolay Abramov	Communist Party	3,057	12.45%
Tatyana Zhulnitova	A Just Russia – For Truth	1,069	4.35%
Mikhail Afanasyev	Communists of Russia	940	3.83%
Oleg Shurchalov	Liberal Democratic Party	808	3.29%
Total		24,563	100%

==== District 4 ====
Summary of the 8–10 September 2023 Legislative Assembly of Ulyanovsk Oblast election in Novospassky constituency 4
Candidate	Party	Votes	%
Maria Shpak	United Russia	19,279	68.36%
Oleg Yedelkin	Communist Party	4,921	17.45%
Dmitry Khovrin	Liberal Democratic Party	1,693	6.00%
Gennady Chigleyev	Communists of Russia	1,266	4.49%
Total		28,204	100%

==== District 5 ====
Summary of the 8–10 September 2023 Legislative Assembly of Ulyanovsk Oblast election in Sengileyevsky constituency 5
Candidate	Party	Votes	%
Vyacheslav Kovel (incumbent)	United Russia	12,665	57.47%
Yevgeny Lisov	Liberal Democratic Party	4,025	18.26%
Roman Kogtev	Communist Party	3,624	16.45%
Oleg Manakovsky	A Just Russia – For Truth	1,036	4.70%
Total		22,037	100%

==== District 6 ====
Summary of the 8–10 September 2023 Legislative Assembly of Ulyanovsk Oblast election in Tsilninsky constituency 6
Candidate	Party	Votes	%
Sergey Bezzubenkov	United Russia	12,203	51.70%
Ramil Khakimov	Communist Party	4,061	17.21%
Shamil Shaydullov	Liberal Democratic Party	2,926	12.40%
Andrey Ivanov	Communists of Russia	2,392	10.13%
Viktor Tarasov	A Just Russia – For Truth	1,134	4.80%
Total		23,603	100%

==== District 7 ====
Summary of the 8–10 September 2023 Legislative Assembly of Ulyanovsk Oblast election in Cherdaklinsky constituency 7
Candidate	Party	Votes	%
Vadim Martynov (incumbent)	United Russia	16,666	63.79%
Pavel Arkhipov	Communist Party	3,689	14.12%
Maksim Korsakov	Liberal Democratic Party	2,380	9.11%
Nail Yusupov	Communists of Russia	1,324	5.07%
Ilya Motayev	A Just Russia – For Truth	1,255	4.80%
Total		26,127	100%

==== District 8 ====
Summary of the 8–10 September 2023 Legislative Assembly of Ulyanovsk Oblast election in Melekessky constituency 8
Candidate	Party	Votes	%
Ramil Khayrullin (incumbent)	United Russia	11,149	53.96%
Nikita Konovalov	Communist Party	3,003	14.53%
Natalya Lepeshkina	A Just Russia – For Truth	2,197	10.63%
Aleksey Chervyakov	Liberal Democratic Party	2,006	9.71%
Yevgeny Krasnov	Communists of Russia	1,272	6.16%
Total		20,661	100%

==== District 9 ====
Summary of the 8–10 September 2023 Legislative Assembly of Ulyanovsk Oblast election in Dimitrovgradsky constituency 9
Candidate	Party	Votes	%
Aleksey Koshayev	United Russia	8,423	52.20%
Gabdulkhak Murzakhanov (incumbent)	Communist Party	2,761	17.11%
Aleksey Yakushev	New People	1,850	11.46%
Ernest Staratelev	Liberal Democratic Party	1,216	7.54%
Rafael Byakhtygareyev	A Just Russia – For Truth	981	6.08%
Total		16,137	100%

==== District 10 ====
Summary of the 8–10 September 2023 Legislative Assembly of Ulyanovsk Oblast election in Zavolzhsky constituency 10
Candidate	Party	Votes	%
Yury Mukhin	United Russia	6,522	54.86%
Lyudmila Shishkina	Communist Party	1,998	16.81%
Aleksey Medvedev (incumbent)	Liberal Democratic Party	1,491	12.54%
Vladimir Nikiforov	New People	750	6.31%
Lyudmila Shishkova	Communists of Russia	486	4.09%
Yevgeny Buyarov	A Just Russia – For Truth	328	2.76%
Total		11,888	100%

==== District 11 ====
Summary of the 8–10 September 2023 Legislative Assembly of Ulyanovsk Oblast election in Zavolzhsky constituency 11
Candidate	Party	Votes	%
Vladimir Parfenov	United Russia	5,020	34.91%
Aleksey Tsibarkov	Liberal Democratic Party	3,658	25.44%
Roman Sultashov (incumbent)	Communist Party	2,111	14.68%
Marat Aryapov	New People	1,592	11.07%
Aleksey Smolenkov	Communists of Russia	829	5.76%
Leysyan Kayumova	A Just Russia – For Truth	771	5.36%
Total		14,381	100%

==== District 12 ====
Summary of the 8–10 September 2023 Legislative Assembly of Ulyanovsk Oblast election in Zavolzhsky constituency 12
Candidate	Party	Votes	%
Nikolay Lazarev	United Russia	4,766	43.14%
Pavel Firsov	Communist Party	1,901	17.21%
Dmitry Baranenkov	Liberal Democratic Party	1,375	12.45%
Andrey Sedov (incumbent)	A Just Russia – For Truth	1,075	9.73%
Valentina Nikonova	New People	781	7.07%
Dmitry Afanasyev	Communists of Russia	711	6.44%
Total		11,047	100%

==== District 13 ====
Summary of the 8–10 September 2023 Legislative Assembly of Ulyanovsk Oblast election in Leninsky constituency 13
Candidate	Party	Votes	%
Marina Bespalova	United Russia	5,906	48.08%
Aleksandr Spitsyn	Communist Party	2,138	17.40%
Aleksey Yarkov (incumbent)	Liberal Democratic Party	1,565	12.74%
Konstantin Tolkachyov	New People	1,002	8.16%
Sergey Avdonichev	A Just Russia – For Truth	718	5.85%
Valery Marakin	Communists of Russia	509	4.14%
Total		12,284	100%

==== District 14 ====
Summary of the 8–10 September 2023 Legislative Assembly of Ulyanovsk Oblast election in Leninsky constituency 14
Candidate	Party	Votes	%
Dmitry Grachev	Liberal Democratic Party	4,045	31.24%
Vitaly Kuzin	Communist Party	2,798	21.61%
Ramil Valitov	United Russia	2,543	19.64%
Aleksandr Bragin	New People	1,411	10.90%
Artyom Titov	Communists of Russia	857	6.62%
Grigory Matveyev	A Just Russia – For Truth	763	5.89%
Total		12,947	100%

==== District 15 ====
Summary of the 8–10 September 2023 Legislative Assembly of Ulyanovsk Oblast election in Zheleznodorozhny constituency 15
Candidate	Party	Votes	%
Konstantin Anokhin	United Russia	6,509	53.10%
Matvey Volodarsky	Liberal Democratic Party	1,661	13.55%
Yury Suponya	Communist Party	1,547	12.62%
Olga Svirid	New People	831	6.78%
Vasily Vasin	Communists of Russia	767	6.26%
Sergey Borisov	A Just Russia – For Truth	577	4.71%
Total		12,258	100%

==== District 16 ====
Summary of the 8–10 September 2023 Legislative Assembly of Ulyanovsk Oblast election in Zasviyazhsky constituency 16
Candidate	Party	Votes	%
Vasily Gvozdev (incumbent)	United Russia	5,432	41.22%
Lilya Bautina	Liberal Democratic Party	4,544	34.48%
Yakov Pankov	Communist Party	1,641	12.45%
Vladimir Kulakov	Communists of Russia	605	4.59%
Sergey Tupikin	A Just Russia – For Truth	444	3.37%
Total		13,177	100%

==== District 17 ====
Summary of the 8–10 September 2023 Legislative Assembly of Ulyanovsk Oblast election in Zasviyazhsky constituency 17
Candidate	Party	Votes	%
Sergey Morgachev	Independent	4,799	38.68%
Mayis Dadashov	United Russia	2,299	18.53%
Vadim Belov	Communist Party	1,826	14.72%
Aleksey Semenov	Liberal Democratic Party	1,223	9.86%
Marina Tsvetkova	A Just Russia – For Truth	747	6.02%
Gleb Astashenkov	New People	669	5.39%
Denis Guryanov	Communists of Russia	442	3.56%
Total		12,406	100%

==== District 18 ====
Summary of the 8–10 September 2023 Legislative Assembly of Ulyanovsk Oblast election in Zasviyazhsky constituency 18
Candidate	Party	Votes	%
Denis Sedov	United Russia	7,020	59.07%
Maksim Zakharov	Communist Party	1,642	13.82%
Aleksandr Grachev	Liberal Democratic Party	1,325	11.15%
Albert Iskhakov	New People	620	5.22%
Nikolay Vasilyev	A Just Russia – For Truth	541	4.55%
Yekaterina Karaush	Communists of Russia	392	3.30%
Total		11,884	100%

== See also ==
- 2023 Russian regional elections
