= Vladislav Tikhomirov =

Russian politician (1939–2017)

- Владислав Тихомиров
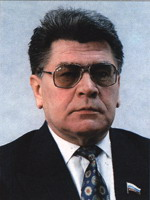

2nd Head of Ivanovo Oblast Administration
- In office 1 February 1996 – December 2000
- Preceded by: Adolf Laptev
- Succeeded by: Vladimir Tikhonov

1st Chairman of the Legislative Assembly of Ivanovo Oblast
- In office March 1994 – 1 February 1996
- Succeeded by: Valery Nikologorsky

Personal details
- Born: 14 August 1939 Kukoboy, Pervomaysky District, Yaroslavl Oblast, RSFSR, Soviet Union
- Died: 19 June 2017 (aged 77) Ivanovo, Russia

Vladislav Nikolayevich Tikhomirov (Russian: Владислав Николаевич Тихомиров; 14 August 1939 – 19 June 2017) was a Russian statesman. He was the 2nd Governor of Ivanovo Oblast from 1996 to 2000.

== Biography ==
Vladislav Tikhomirov was born on 14 August 1939 in Kukoboy. His father, Nikolay, was a career officer, died at the front, and mother worked as a teacher.

In 1962, he graduated from the Ivanovo Agricultural Institute. From 1962 to 1964 he worked as an agronomist-economist at the Kineshemsky state farm.

=== Party career and political activity ===
From 1964 to 1971, he was the first secretary of the Kineshemsky District committee of the Komsomol, the head of the department, the second secretary of the Ivanovo regional committee of the Komsomol. From 1971 to 1975, he was the deputy head of the agriculture department of the Ivanovo Regional Committee of the CPSU, and the First Secretary of the Komsomolsk District Committee of the CPSU of the Ivanovo Oblast. From 1979 to 1987, he was the first secretary of the Gavrilovo-Posadsky District committee of the CPSU, and the secretary of the regional committee for the agro-industrial complex. From 1987 to 1990, he was the Chairman of the Executive Committee, and in 1990, Tikhomirov became Chairman of the Ivanovo Regional Council. Tikhomirov was elected People's Deputy of the RSFSR.

From 1994 to 1996, Tikokhmirov was the Chairman of the Legislative Assembly of the Ivanovo Oblast. In 1996, he was appointed and then elected governor of the Ivanovo Oblast (50.12% in the first round), ex officio was a member of the Federation Council, and was deputy chairman of the Committee on Agrarian Policy.

Tikhomirov did not stand in the 2000 gubernatorial election. From 2001 to 2005, he was a deputy of the Legislative Assembly of the Ivanovo Oblast of the third convocation, chair of the United Russia faction.

He died on 19 June 2017, and was buried in the Balino cemetery.

== Personal life ==
He was married and had a son. He was fond of music.
