= Viktor Smirnov =

Russian politician (born 1968)

- Виктор Смирнов
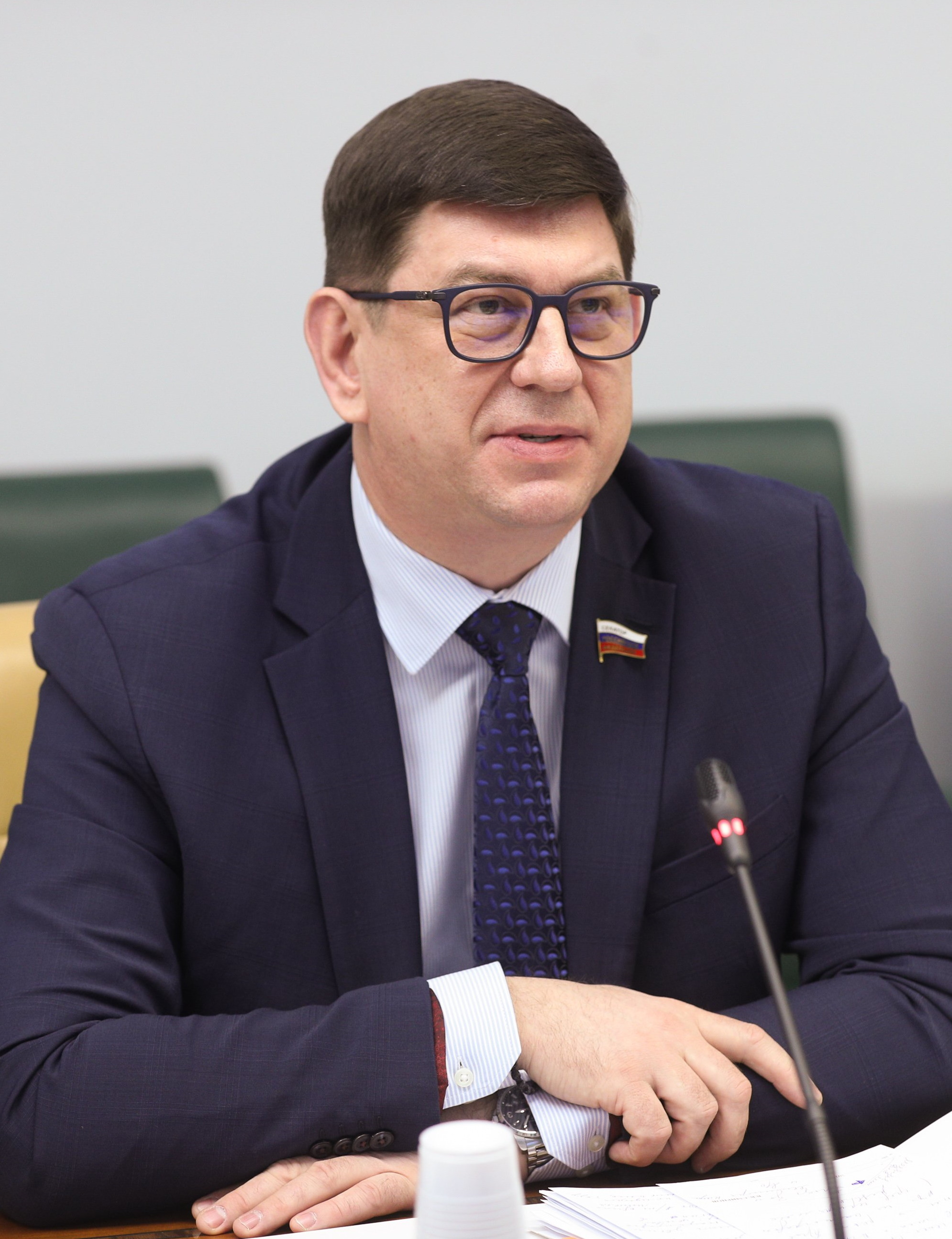

Member of the State Duma for Ivanovo Oblast
- Incumbent
- Assumed office 12 October 2021
- Preceded by: Aleksey Khokhlov
- Constituency: Ivanovo (No. 91)

Senator from the Legislative Assembly of Volgograd Oblast
- In office 27 September 2018 – 6 October 2021
- Preceded by: Vladimir Bochkov
- Succeeded by: Alexander Gusakovsky

Personal details
- Born: 9 September 1968 (age 58) Zavolzhsk, Ivanovo Oblast, Russian SFSR, USSR
- Party: United Russia
- Education: Yaroslavl State Pedagogical Institute; North-West Academy of Public Administration

Viktor Vladimirovich Smirnov (Russian: Виктор Владимирович Смирнов; September 9, 1968, Kineshma, Ivanovo Oblast) is a Russian political figure, deputy of the 8th State Dumas.

Smirnov started his political career in 1993 when he was elected deputy of the municipal committee of the city of Zavolzhsk. Later he continued working as the head of the Department of Education of the Administration of Kokhma. From 2002 to 2003, Smirnov was a docent at the Department of Constitutional Law and General Theoretical Legal Disciplines of the Ivanovo Branch of the International Institute of Management. He left the post to start working at the election commission of the Ivanovo Oblast. In 2005–2012, Smirnov worked as the chairman of the regional electoral committee. From June 2012 to September 2013, he served as vice-governor of the Ivanovo Oblast. Due to the election to the Ivanovo Oblast Duma of the 6th convocation, he left the post. In 2018, Smirnov became a member of the Federation Council. Since September 2021, he has served as deputy of the 8th State Duma.
