= Vladimir Bochkov =

Russian politician (1946–2022)

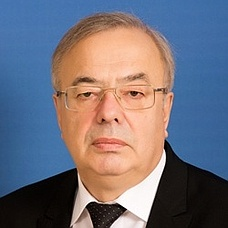

Member of the Federation Council of Russia
- In office 24 October 2013 – 27 September 2018
- Preceded by: Yury Smirnov
- Succeeded by: Viktor Smirnov
- Constituency: Ivanovo Oblast

Personal details
- Born: Vladimir Mikhailovich Bochkov; 1 July 1946 Ivanovo, Russian SFSR, Soviet Union
- Died: 31 March 2022 (aged 75)
- Party: United Russia

Vladimir Mikhailovich Bochkov (Russian: Владимир Михайлович Бочков; 1 July 1946 – 31 March 2022) was a Russian politician. A member of United Russia, he served in the Federation Council from 2013 to 2018.

Since 2000, he had been elected as a deputy of the Ivanovo Legislative Assembly (and was re-elected in 2005, 2008, and 2013). He held the position of Chairman of the Committee of the Ivanovo Regional Duma on Budget, Financial and Tax Policy.

In 2000, he ran for the post of Head of the City of Ivanovo. In the voting held on 3 December, he received 13.52% of the vote and finished third, losing to Alexander Groshev, who became mayor, and to Ivan Pimenov.

In 2006, he was recognized as the Manager of the Year of the Russian Federation.

On 24 October 2013, he was vested with the powers of a member of the Federation Council of the Federal Assembly of the Russian Federation, serving as the representative from the Ivanovo Regional Duma.

He died on 31 March 2022, at the age of 75.

== Awards and titles ==
- June 27, 2017 — Order of Alexander Nevsky (for his great contribution to the development of Russian parliamentarism and active legislative activity);
- July 25, 2006 — Order of Honour (for the achieved labor successes and many years of conscientious work);
- Honorary citizen of the city of Ivanov;
- 2000 — Order of St. Sergius of Radonezh, III degree (The Russian Orthodox Church);
- 2002 — Badge "For services to the Ivanovo-Voznesenskaya Diocese" of the II degree (The Russian Orthodox Church).
