= Saint Petersburg State Institute of Film and Television =

University in Saint Petersburg, Russia

- Санкт-Петербургский государственный институт кино и телевидения
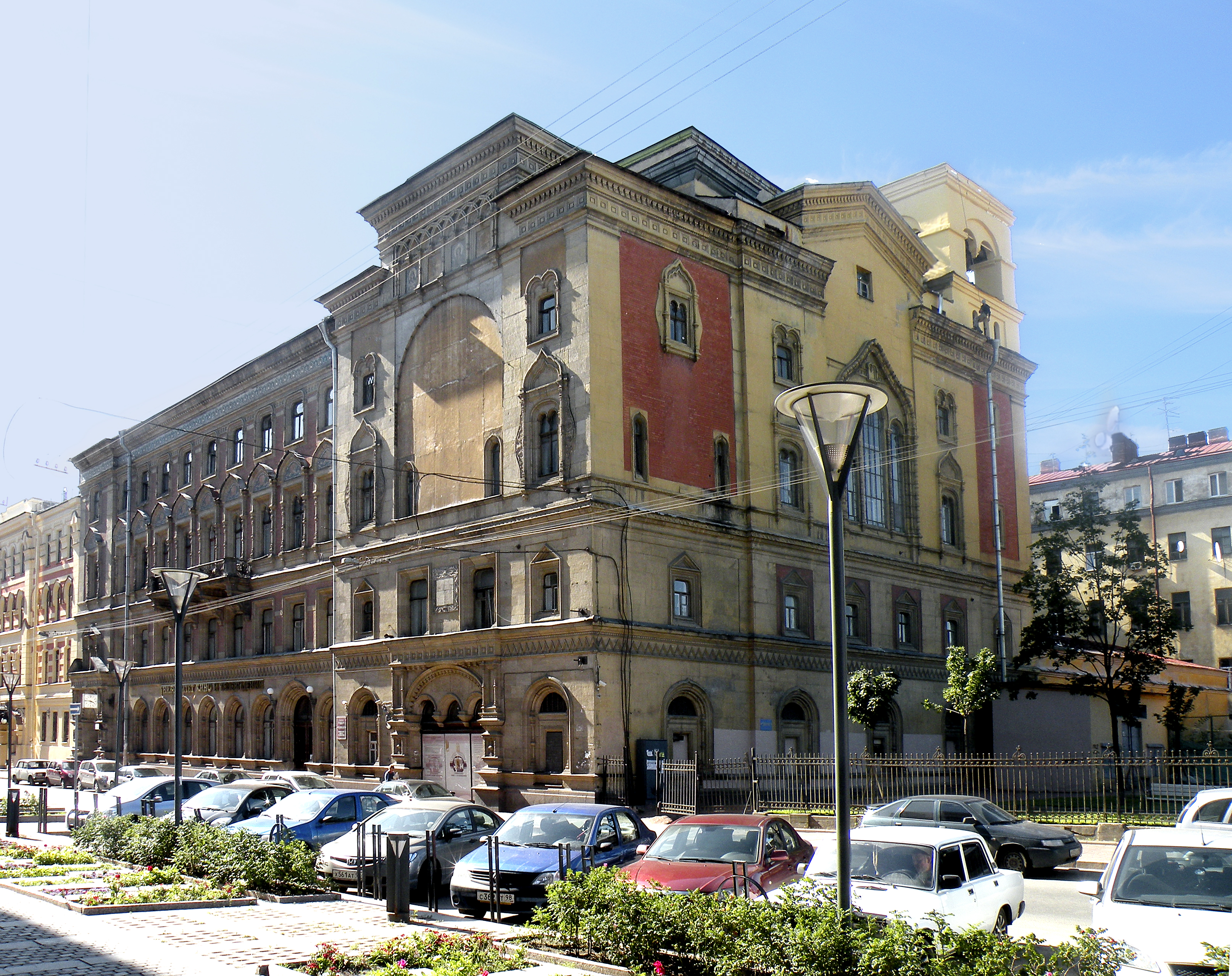
- Type: public
- Established: 1918
- Location: Saint Petersburg, Russia; 59.8879°N 30.3645°E
- Campus: urban
- Language: Russian

Saint Petersburg State Institute of Film and Television (Russian: Санкт-Петербургский государственный институт кино и телевидения, abbreviated SPbGIKiT) is a federal state budgetary institution of higher education in Saint Petersburg, Russia, training students for cinema, television and related media work. Its founder is the Ministry of Culture of the Russian Federation. The legal address is 22 Bukharestskaya Street, and the postal address is 13 Pravdy Street. On 1 October 2025 the institute counted 3,824 students: 2,936 in bachelor's, specialist and master's programs, 855 in secondary vocational programs, 22 in postgraduate research training and 11 in an assistantship-traineeship. In 2025 the structure comprised three faculties—screen arts, media technologies and continuing education—20 departments and a college.

The institute traces its foundation to a decree of the Council of People's Commissars of the Russian Soviet Federative Socialist Republic, dated 9 September 1918 and published in Izvestia on 14 September. Signed by People's Commissar of Education Anatoly Lunacharsky and by the council's administrator Vladimir Bonch-Bruyevich, the decree created in Petrograd a Higher Institute of Photography and Phototechnics under the commissariat, for photographic and phototechnical industry, professional training in optics, photography, phototechnics and printing, and specialized research. The Saint Petersburg Encyclopedia records a school of photography in 1924, an Institute of Motion-Picture Engineers in 1930, and a renaming as the St. Petersburg Institute of Cinema and Television in 1992. The institute's 2017 self-study report instead dates the Leningrad Institute of Film Engineers to 1931, cites an order of the Ministry of Science, Higher Education and Technical Policy of 7 December 1992 (No. 1120) for the 1992 name, and cites orders of the Ministry of Education of 23 November 1998 (No. 2877) and of the State Committee for Cinematography of 24 December 1998 that renamed it the St. Petersburg State University of Film and Television; it states that the historical designation "institute" was restored in 2014.

The complex at 13 Pravdy Street was built in 1898–1901 to designs by Alexander Pomerantsev as a model parish school and church for the Schools Council of the Most Holy Synod, in the Russian Revival style, and is registered as a cultural-heritage site of regional significance. The same architectural record identifies the later occupant as the university, and then the institute, of film and television. Among the teachers named by the Saint Petersburg Encyclopedia are the graphic artist Anna Ostroumova-Lebedeva, the physicist Pyotr Lukirsky and the sound inventor Alexander Shorin.

On 25 September 2025 the film director Viktor Tatarsky had become acting rector, succeeding Ekaterina Sazonova, who had led the institute since October 2023. The paper described Tatarsky as a graduate of the Leningrad State Institute of Culture and a docent in fiction-film directing at SPbGIKiT since 2021. Earlier in 2025 a conflict over methodological instructions that required directing students and their teachers to clear projects with an artistic council and with producing students: department head Artyom Antonov was removed from his post, the director Dmitry Meskhiev received three reprimands and submitted a resignation, and students wrote to the culture minister; on 10 April the ministry said the instructions and the council had been abolished. The institute organizes PiterKiT, a festival of student films. The 25th edition was to open on 10 November 2025 with support from the Ministry of Culture and the St. Petersburg Committee for Culture, after the organizers received 500 submissions, 63 of them from other countries.

== History ==
=== Founding as a photography institute ===
Founded on 9 September 1918 by decree of the Council of People's Commissars of the RSFSR in Petrograd as the Higher Institute of Photography and Phototechnics. Signed by People's Commissar of Education Anatoly Lunacharsky and by Vladimir Bonch-Bruyevich for the Council, the decree charged the institute with developing photographic knowledge and industry, raising training in optics, photography, phototechnics and printing, and carrying out research.

An archival study of fund 2963 in the Central State Archive of St. Petersburg describes the school as Russia's first higher photographic institute and traces it to a council that included Vyacheslav Sreznevsky, Dmitry Leshchenko, Vladimir Ignatovsky, Alexander Popovitsky, Vladimir Kurbatov, Sergey Prokudin-Gorsky, Pyotr Lazarev and others. Popovitsky, a forensic-photography specialist at the Expedition for the Preparation of State Papers, was elected rector, and Sreznevsky became the first dean of the scientific-photographic faculty, with photochemical and physicomechanical divisions, investigative photography, and a program for forensic experts. Within a year the institute had nine laboratories, workshops, a museum and a library, stocked partly from requisitions and from gifts that included Sreznevsky's workshop and Prokudin-Gorsky's photochemical laboratory. The graphic artist Anna Ostroumova-Lebedeva taught there from 1918 to 1922.

The school occupied 13 Pravdy Street, formerly Kabinetskaya Street, a complex built in 1898–1901 for the Synod's school council and a church of Alexander Nevsky and transferred to the institute in 1918. The archival study dates a renaming as the Petrograd Phototechnical Institute to 1921 and an optical faculty to 1920. From March 1923 an agreement with the Sevzapkino factory put a factory representative on the council and moved production services to the factory. Popovitsky died in April 1923; after a short acting rectorship by V. N. Kononov, N. E. Ermilov became rector on 10 April, and on 1 October 1923, largely for financial reasons, the institute became the Petrograd Photo-Cine Technical School, keeping its laboratories. The Encyclopedia of Saint Petersburg dates a phototechnical school from 1924 rather than 1923.

In 1920 in the USSR was developed the technology of domestic production of photographic paper and bromogelatin negative photoplates, construction of first Soviet photo cameras and cinema projectors. X-ray film was produced. In 1921, the Institute opened an optical faculty.

=== The Leningrad Institute of Film Engineers ===
The guide to fund R-4802 of the Central State Archive of St. Petersburg records that an Institute of Sound-Film Engineers was formed in September 1930, reorganized in February 1931 into a photo-combine of higher and secondary phototechnics, and restored in 1932 as the Institute of Film Engineers. From 1 September 1930 until 1945 it was under the Committee for Cinematography Affairs attached to the Council of People's Commissars; later superiors included the USSR Ministry of Cinematography and, in 1954–1962, the culture ministries of the USSR and the RSFSR. The city encyclopedia dates the Leningrad Institute of Film Engineers (LIKI) from 1930 and lists among its teachers Viktor Zamirailo, the physicist Pyotr Lukirsky, Dmitry Mitrokhin, Ostroumova-Lebedeva and the sound-film engineer Alexander Shorin.

In 1929, the first sound cinema in the USSR was opened in Leningrad. In 1930, the institute was divided into the Leningrad Institute of Film Engineers (LIKI – ЛИКИ – Ленинградский институт киноинженеров), the Film College and courses for extramural training of film technicians.

A notice in Smena of 12 July 1938 shows LIKI, still at 13 Pravdy Street, recruiting for electrotechnical, mechanical and chemical-photo-technological faculties, with applications until 1 August and classes from 1 September. The St. Petersburg encyclopedia records that the documentary filmmaker Efim Uchitel finished LIKI's operator department in 1935. In the mid-1930s the Leningrad Society for Educational and Scientific Cinematography worked with the institute: the teacher A. M. Khristiani sat on a section bureau, and for a time the society was housed in the institute building.

=== War, evacuation and the late Soviet decades ===
The institute's wartime history says that during the Siege of Leningrad many teachers and students went to the front, among them the 3rd battalion of the Frunzensky district and the people's militia, and that equipment, laboratories, teachers and students were evacuated to Pyatigorsk. The German advance in the Caucasus forced a further move in August 1942 to Samarkand. Classes resumed in October 1942 with about 100 students on three faculties; teachers with the school included V. I. Volynkin, B. A. Burkov, Z. V. Tsyrulina and A. M. Brusilovsky, and a first wartime graduation in August 1943 awarded engineering diplomas to 22 people. The institute returned in 1945, regular classes in Leningrad began on 5 October, and the first postwar graduation there numbered 62 engineers; by 1 September 1946 there were more than 1,000 students, with foreign students admitted from 1947. A memorial plaque of the 1960s on the Pravdy Street building commemorates staff who died in 1941–1945.

During the Second World War, the institute was evacuated to Pyatigorsk, and later, after the worsening of the military situation, to Samarkand (Uzbekistan). During the war there were about 100 people studying at the three faculties. In 1945, the institute returned to Leningrad.

In the 1970s, with the rapid development of television, the Department of Film and Television Engineering was created. Research work began to unfold, aimed at improving the equipment and technology of cinematography and related industries, and scientific cooperation between LIKI and the Mosfilm and Lenfilm studios intensified.

=== Renaming after 1991 ===
The archival guide places the renaming as the St. Petersburg Institute of Film and Television, and then university status, in December 1992 and December 1998. Its 2017 self-study report cites an order of the Ministry of Science, Higher Education and Technical Policy of 7 December 1992, No. 1120, for the 1992 name, and orders of the Ministry of Education of 23 November 1998, No. 2877, and of Goskino of 24 December 1998, No. 7-1-19/75, for the university title. The city encyclopedia, describing the school in the early 2000s, dates the university name from 1999.

In 1992, the institute was renamed the St. Petersburg Institute of Cinematography and Television (SPIKiT), and in 1998 it was awarded university status and became known as the St. Petersburg State University of Film and Television.

In 2014 that title was dropped. The self-study report states that a charter of the federal state budgetary educational institution "Saint Petersburg State Institute of Film and Television," adopted by a conference of employees and students on 15 September 2014, was approved by order No. 1767 of the Ministry of Culture on 16 October 2014; the ministry exercises the founder's powers. A local record of the Pravdy Street building also dates the return to the institute name to 2014.

The institute is a member of the International Association of Film Schools of the World (CILECT). Since 2001, the institute has held the annual PiterKiT Student Film Festival.

== Campus ==
=== The Pravdy Street building ===
The institute's main teaching complex is at 13 Pravdy Street in central Saint Petersburg, its postal address. Until 1 September 1923 the street was Kabinetskaya. Directories place the Synod's School Council at Kabinetskaya 13, at the corner with Zvenigorodskaya Street; by 1924 the same site is listed as Pravdy Street, formerly Kabinetskaya.

The complex was built in 1898–1901 in a Russian Revival reading of seventeenth-century forms, to a design by Alexander Pomerantsev, with A. A. Staborovsky as builder. On 13 January 1895 the Most Holy Synod accepted a proposal from Chief Procurator Konstantin Pobedonostsev to commemorate Emperor Alexander III with a model parish school and its own church. The School Council, created in 1885 to supervise parish schools, was later housed in the same building. Archbishop Gury of Novgorod laid the foundation on 14 June 1898, and Metropolitan Anthony (Vadkovsky) consecrated the Church of St Alexander Nevsky on 17 January 1901. The five-domed, double-height church occupied part of the third floor. Facades were clad in yellow Radom sandstone and set with mosaic, including a panel of Christ blessing children after cartoons by Academician A. N. Novoskoltsev, made in the workshop of V. A. Frolov.

The church closed on 30 July 1918, when the building passed to the Higher Institute of Photography and Phototechnics. In 1947–1948 the interior was rebuilt for teaching. The five cupolas, a small dome over the pediment, and the tented roof of the bell tower have been lost; the protected fabric still includes the bell-tower volume above the north-east corner of the street range. Registered as "The School Council of the Synod with the Church of the Right-Believing Prince Alexander Nevsky and a school", at Pravdy Street 13, litera A, it is a monument of federal significance, listed by a government decree of 10 July 2001. The register dates the monument to 1898–1900.

The entrance mosaic was later found under paint. Its largest part measures 6.6 by 8.4 metres, about 55 square metres. Restoration of the two principal facades was reported finished in January 2015, and on 12 May 2015 the panel was unveiled and consecrated by Bishop Markell of Tsarskoye Selo. Reports at the time said that restoring the cupolas was not planned and that the Russian Orthodox Church was not seeking the building back.

=== Other sites ===
The legal address is 22 Bukharestskaya Street. The film and video technical college, a structural subdivision, is at 20 Pravdy Street, near the main complex. No. 20 is the 1903–1904 Art Nouveau apartment house of A. Yu. Tami and S. M. Deichman, designed by Silvio Danini and listed as a monument of regional significance. After 1904, Maria Stoyunina's private girls' gymnasium used the third and fourth floors of the right-hand part. The philosopher Nikolai Lossky lived in the house; directories place him there from 1904 to 1922. It later held a Soviet labour school, was a formation point of the 3rd Frunze people's-militia division in July 1941, and was a children's home during the siege. The college now shares it with kindergarten No. 20 of the Central District. In November 2025 the city finished the main stage of a facade restoration funded through the monuments committee, recovering the historic colour, yellow and red kabanchik tiles, thistle-leaf stucco, and wrought-iron balcony rails. Work on the metal brackets was left for 2026.

== Structure ==
=== Faculties and programs ===
The institute is a federal institution of the Ministry of Culture; the 2025 efficiency-monitoring file gives its address as 13 Pravdy Street in Saint Petersburg. For 2025 the self-study described three faculties—Screen Arts, Media Technologies and Additional Education—with 20 departments and the film and video technical college. In 2025 the Faculty of Media Technologies added a department of animation and media design.

At the start of 2025/26, bachelor's, specialist and master's study covered engineering and technical sciences, social sciences, and art and culture: eight enlarged groups, 20 fields or specialties and 33 programs, full-time and, for some, by mixed attendance or correspondence. Bachelor's fields then taught were information systems, radio engineering, advertising and public relations, journalism, television, arts and humanities, folk artistic culture, dramaturgy, media-industry design, and restoration of film and photographic documents. Specialist fields were acting, with a musical-theatre specialization opened that year; animation and computer graphics; film and television directing; sound; cinematography; producing; and film studies. Master's programs were television, aimed at management of television enterprises; photographic art; and screenwriting. The license also names electronics and nanoelectronics, socio-cultural activity, and master's study in advertising and in arts and humanities, which were not on that year's teaching list.

Postgraduate training in 2025 used three scientific specialties—theory and history of culture and art (5.10.1), with a first intake that year; types of art, specified as film, television and other screen arts (5.10.3); and design and technology of instrument-making and radio-electronic equipment (2.2.9)—with 22 full-time postgraduate students at the end of the year, 13 on contract. Assistantship-traineeship, the creative higher-qualification route, is licensed in acting, audiovisual directing, cinematography and sound; 11 assistant-trainees were counted on 1 October 2025. Additional professional education sits with the Faculty of Additional Education.

=== Film and video technical college ===
The Saint Petersburg Film and Video Technical College (Russian: Санкт-Петербургский киновидеотехнический колледж, abbreviated KVTK) is a structural subdivision. The college describes itself as Russia's oldest secondary vocational school of cinematography and dates its line to 1 October 1923, when the photography institute became a photo-cinema technical school with cinema and phototechnical departments; it dates formal creation as the Leningrad Film Technical School to Council of People's Commissars Resolution No. 648 of 29 June 1935. Dmitry Leshchenko, a photochemist who had helped found the 1918 institute, headed the Petrograd phototechnicum from 1924 to 1929. On 1 October 1930 a Leningrad training combine of higher and secondary cine-photo technology was opened on the technicum's base. It used 13 Pravdy Street and, from 1935, the Orlov palace in Strelna. College teaching stopped in the war, when the Strelna building was destroyed; the school resumed in 1945 at 13 Pravdy Street, and since 1968 the address has been 20 Pravdy Street. College status dates from 1992, and in 2007 it entered what was then the Saint Petersburg State University of Film and Television. The college reports that it has trained more than 13,000 specialists for cinematography, television and exhibition. The college calls the house a 1904 Danini building, formerly the Stoyunina gymnasium; in December 2025 the city heritage committee reported that the main stage of restoring the facade of 20 Pravdy Street, letter A, was finished, identifying it as the 1903 Tami and Deichman apartment house by Silvio Danini.

Secondary vocational study is specialty 55.02.01, theatrical and audiovisual equipment: seven programs in 2025, full-time and by correspondence, after basic general or secondary general education, in profiles including film and video equipment, lighting direction, and the technique and technology of audiovisual programs. On 1 October 2025 the college had 855 students, 614 full-time and 241 by correspondence. The 2025 intake was 320, and 128 students defended final qualification work.

== Notable alumni ==
- Iosif Kheifits, film director
- Andrei Kravchuk, film director
