= Eduard Buliya =

Russian professional football player

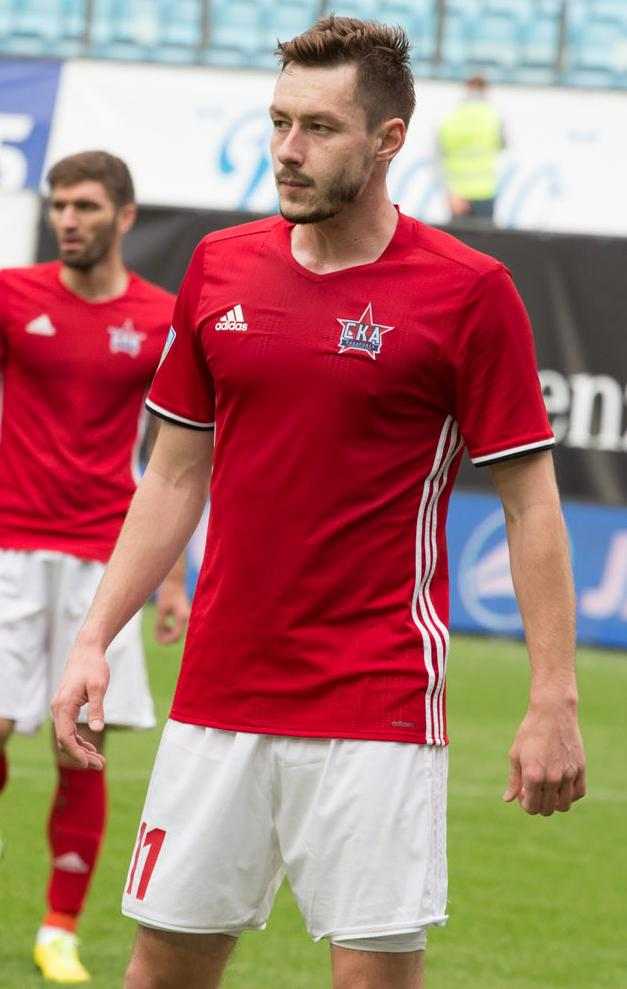
- Buliya with SKA-Khabarovsk in 2016

Personal information
- Full name: Eduard Aleksandrovich Buliya
- Date of birth: 19 May 1991 (age 35)
- Place of birth: Ivanovo, Russian SFSR
- Height: 1.85 m (6 ft 1 in)
- Position: Forward

Senior career*
Years	Team	Apps	(Gls)
2008–2010	FC Shinnik Yaroslavl	5	(0)
2009	→ FC Tekstilshchik Ivanovo (loan)	9	(0)
2011	FC Kooperator Vichuga		
2013–2014	FC Sever Murmansk	31	(4)
2014–2015	FC Tekstilshchik Ivanovo	20	(5)
2015–2016	FC Shinnik Yaroslavl	21	(4)
2016–2017	FC SKA-Khabarovsk	24	(1)
2017–2018	FC Shinnik Yaroslavl	52	(6)
2019	FC SKA-Khabarovsk	13	(2)
2019–2020	FC Rotor Volgograd	10	(0)
2020	→ FC SKA-Khabarovsk (loan)	2	(0)
2020–2021	FC SKA-Khabarovsk	23	(2)
2021–2022	FC Olimp-Dolgoprudny	22	(2)
- * Club domestic league appearances and goals

Eduard Aleksandrovich Buliya (Russian: Эдуард Александрович Булия; born 19 May 1991) is a Russian former professional football player.

== Club career ==
He made his Russian Football National League debut for FC Shinnik Yaroslavl on 21 April 2010 in a game against FC Nizhny Novgorod.
