= Valery Vasilyev (politician) =

Russian politician (born 1965)

- Валерий Васильев
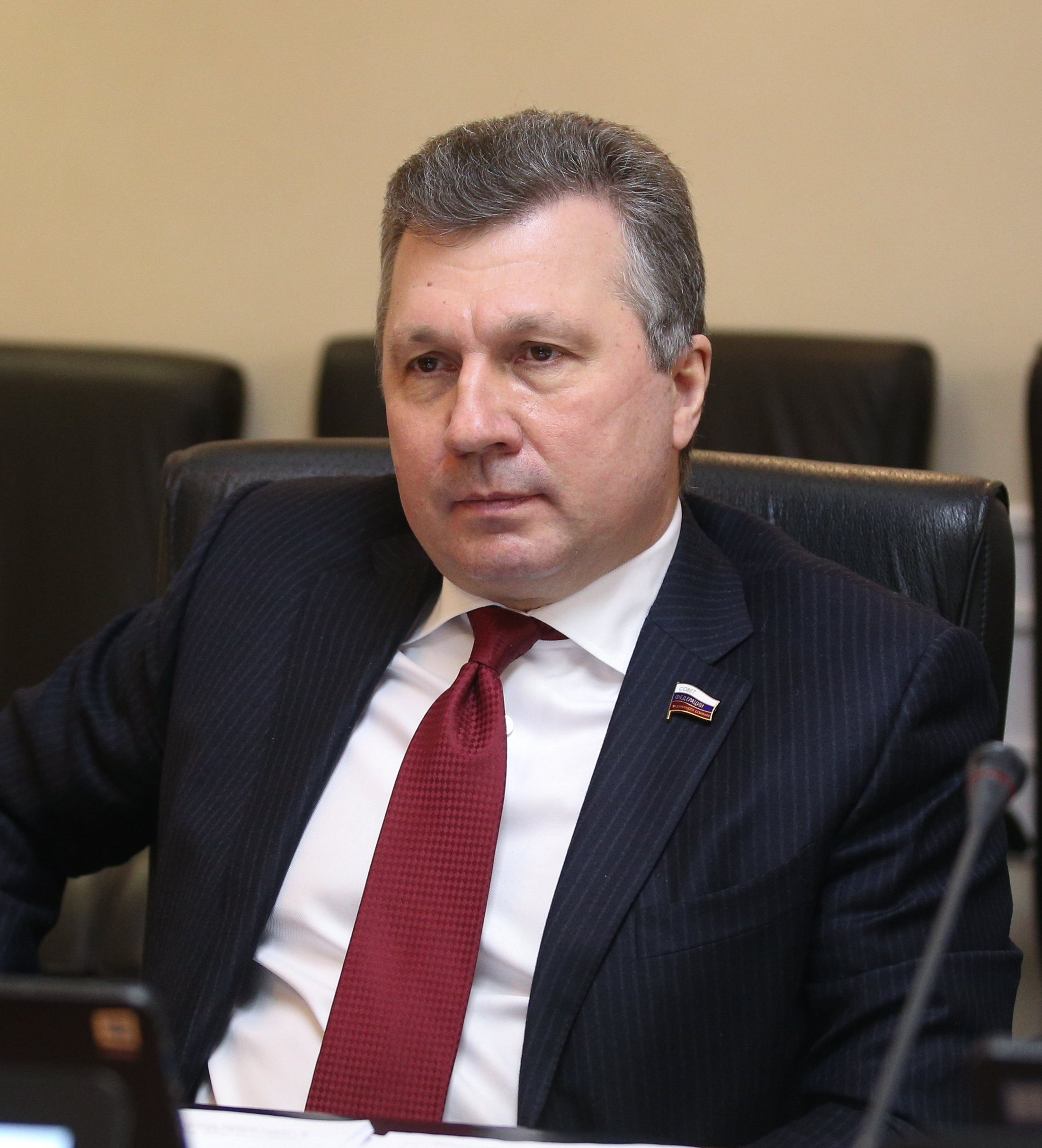

Senator from Ivanovo Oblast
- Incumbent
- Assumed office 29 March 2011
- Preceded by: Yuri Yablokov

Personal details
- Born: Valery Vasilyev; 17 July 1965 (age 61) Aksubayevsky District, Tatarstan, Soviet Union
- Party: United Russia
- Education: Textile Institute of Ivanovo State Polytechnic University

Valery Nikolayevich Vasilyev (Russian: Валерий Николаевич Васильев; born 17 July 1965) is a Russian politician serving as a senator from Ivanovo Oblast since 29 March 2011.

== Career ==
Valery Vasilyev was born on 17 July 1965 in Aksubayevsky District, Tatarstan. In 1999, he graduated from the Textile Institute of Ivanovo State Polytechnic University. From 1983 to 1985, he served in the Soviet Airborne Forces. In the 1990s, he worked in private enterprises. From 1997 to 2002, he was the General Director of JSC "Polyot". From 2002 to 2007, he headed the road management department of the Ivanovo region. In 2005, Vasilyev was elected deputy of the Ivanovo Oblast Duma of the 4th and 5th convocations. From 2008 to 2011, he was the deputy chairman of the regional parliament. In March 2011, he was appointed senator from Ivanovo Oblast.

== Sanctions ==
Valery Vasilyev is under personal sanctions introduced by the European Union, the United Kingdom, the USA, Canada, Switzerland, Australia, Ukraine, New Zealand, for ratifying the decisions of the "Treaty of Friendship, Cooperation and Mutual Assistance between the Russian Federation and the Donetsk People's Republic and between the Russian Federation and the Luhansk People's Republic" and providing political and economic support for Russia's annexation of Ukrainian territories.
