= Stanislav Voskresensky =

Russian politician (born 1976)

- Станислав Воскресенский
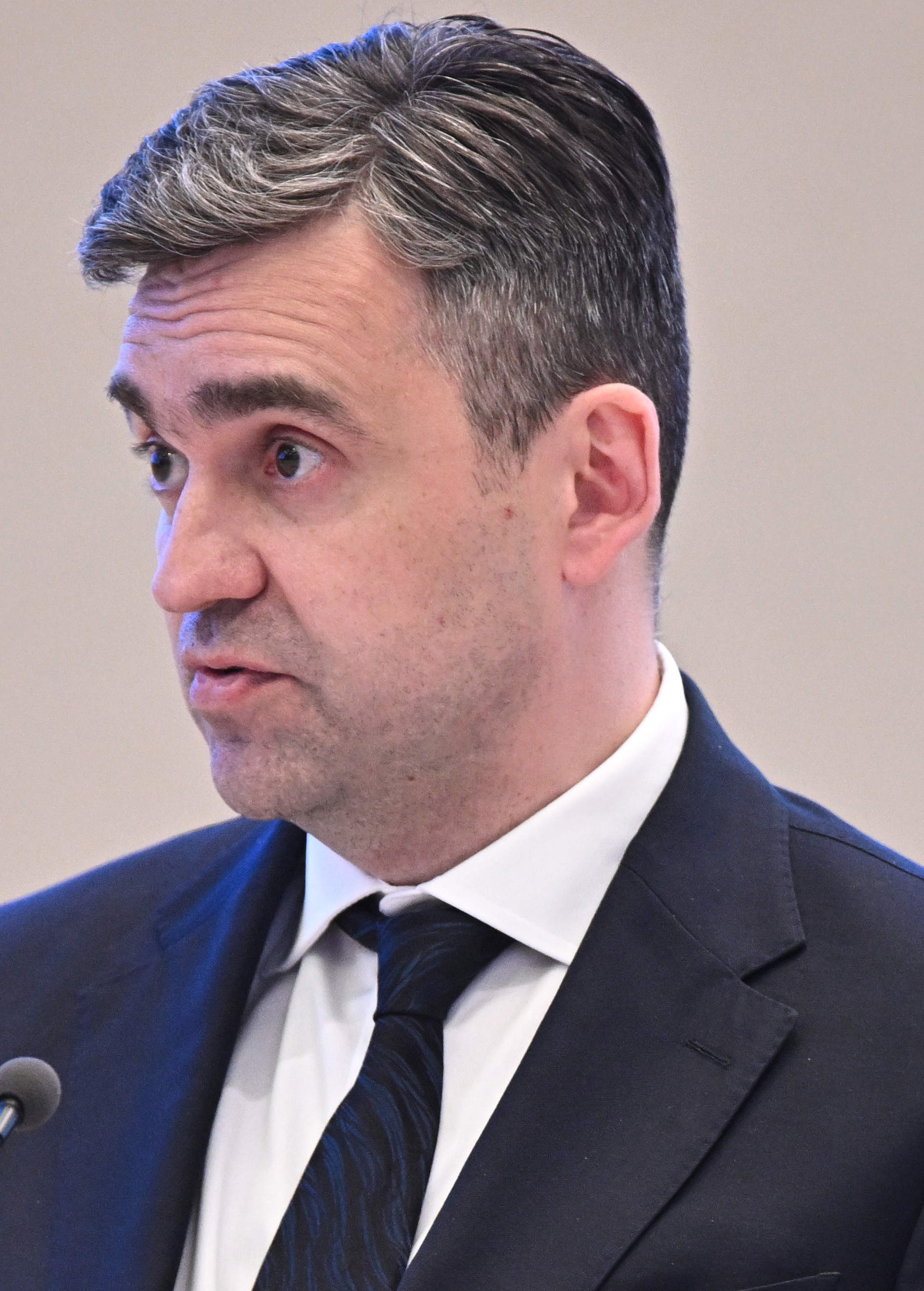
- Voskresensky in 2024

6th Governor of Ivanovo Oblast
- Incumbent
- Assumed office 10 October 2018
- Preceded by: Pavel Konkov

Governor of Ivanovo Oblast (acting)
- In office 10 October 2017 – 10 October 2018

Deputy Minister of Economic Development
- In office 19 August 2014 – 10 October 2017

Deputy Plenipotentiary of the President of the Russian Federation in the Northwestern Federal District
- In office 10 July 2012 – 19 August 2014

Deputy Minister of Economic Development
- In office 9 February 2008 – 10 July 2012

Personal details
- Born: Stanislav Sergeyevich Voskresensky; 29 September 1976 (age 50) Samara, Soviet Union
- Spouse: Sveta Driga
- Children: 2
- Education: Plekhanov Russian University of Economics

Stanislav Sergeyevich Voskresensky (Russian: Станислав Сергеевич Воскресенский; born 29 September 1976) is a Russian politician who is currently the 6th Governor of Ivanovo Oblast from 10 October 2018.

He is the member of the Presidium of the State Council of Russia from 28 August to 2 August 2019 and from 21 December 2020 to the present.

He was also formerly a Deputy Minister of Economic Development from 2008 to 2012 and from 2014 to 2017.

== Biography ==
Stanislav Voskrensensky was born on 29 September 1976 in Kuibyshev (present-day Samara). His father, Sergey Modestovich (born 1956), is an entrepreneur, who was the general director and co-owner of the Special Design and Survey Institute Gidrospetsproekt, served as president of the Soyuzgidrospetsstroy Corporation. Currently, he leads the engineering company Lenhydroproekt (St. Petersburg; subsidiary of RusHydro), and is also a co-owner of Sayangidrospecstroy, GSP-Leasing, SGSS-Leasing, etc.

== Labor activity ==
From 1995 to 1998, he worked in the auditing firm "Marillion".

In 1998, he graduated from the Plekhanov Russian Academy of Economics with a degree in International Economic Relations.

From 1998 to 2000, he was an employee of the tax department of the audit and consulting company Coopers & Lybrand.

In the early 2000s, on a voluntary basis, Voskrensensky participated in the work of tax committees of the Russian Union of Industrialists and Entrepreneurs and the Chamber of Commerce and Industry. In the Russian Union of Industrialists and Entrepreneurs he was the deputy head of the committee on budgetary and tax policy.

From 1999 to 2004, he was Chief Financial Officer at companies specializing in underground engineering and construction.

From 2004 to 2007, he was the Assistant to the Expert Department of the President of Russia.

From 2007 to 2008, he was promoted to Deputy Head of the Expert Department of the President of Russia.

From 2008 to 2012, Voskrensensky was Deputy Minister of Economic Development, where he supervised issues on investment and tax policy, tariff regulation, infrastructure reforms and energy efficiency. He played one of the key roles in the organization of the St. Petersburg International Economic Forum and a number of other major international events.

In 2012, he was the representative of the President of Russia for the affairs of the group of leading industrial states and relations with representatives of the leaders of the G20 countries, with the Russian sherpa.

From 11 July 2014 to 19 August 2014, Voskresensky was the Deputy Plenipotentiary Representative of the Northwestern Federal District. His main area of work is overseeing the development of the Kaliningrad Oblast.

On 19 August 2014, he became Deputy Minister of Economic Development again.

== Governor of Ivanovo Oblast ==
On 10 October 2017, Voskrensensky was appointed Acting Governor of the Ivanovo Oblast.

On the Single Voting Day, on 9 September 2018, Voskresensky won the elections for the governor of the Ivanovo Oblast, gaining 65.72% of the vote. He took office on 10 October 2018.

On 27 December 2018, he was appointed head of the working group of the State Council of the Russian Federation in the direction of "Healthcare".

From 28 January to 2 August 2019 and from 21 December 2020, he is the Member of the Presidium of the State Council of the Russia.

== Personal life ==
=== Family ===
He is married and has two daughters. His wife, Sveta Driga, is a model ("Girl of the Month" magazine "Maxim" in 2005), media personality, prototype of the heroine of the film by Andrei Konchalovsky "Gloss". She graduated from the acting department at the New York Film Academy. She starred in several domestic films ("Yolki-2", "1812: Ulanskaya Ballad", "Meeting", "Where the Motherland Begins", "S as a Dollar, Dot, Ji"). Driga is the face of numerous advertising campaigns of famous brands, including such large companies as LG, Bosch, Tervolina, Samsung, Wild Orchid and many others.

=== Hobbies ===
Voskresensky is fond of short and auteur films. On the day of his appointment, the acting governor confessed to journalists that for him the Ivanovo region is, first of all, the birthplace of Andrei Tarkovsky, his favorite director Chairman of the Board of Trustees of the Shorter Film Festival of the Short Film Festival, which was invented by the politician himself.

He blogs on Instagram and Facebook.

=== Political views ===
The Ivanovo journalist Aleksey Mashkevich believes that Voskresensky does not like the Soviet period of history. Apparently, this is why the governor abandoned the traditional event: laying flowers at the monument to Mikhail Frunze, the Soviet statesman and military leader, the creator of the region, on his birthday.

== Sanctions ==
On February 24, 2023, Voskresensky was added to the U.S. Department of State sanctions list as a person involved in "carrying out Russian operations and aggression against Ukraine, as well as the unlawful administration of occupied Ukrainian territories in the interests of the Russian Federation," specifically for "mobilizing citizens for the war in Ukraine."

On April 1, 2023, he was included in Ukraine’s sanctions list as the “head of a state body who supported/encouraged/publicly approved the policy of the Russian Federation aimed at conducting military actions and committing genocide against the civilian population in Ukraine.”
