= Ivanovo Oblast Duma =

Regional parliament of Ivanovo Oblast, Russia

Ivanovo Oblast Duma Ивановская областная дума
- 7th legislature

Type
- Type: Unicameral

Leadership
- Chairwoman: Marina Dmitriyeva, United Russia since 21 September 2018

Structure
- Seats: 26
- Political groups: United Russia (27) LDPR (2) CPRF (1)

Elections
- Last election: 8-10 September 2023
- Next election: 2028

Meeting place
- 5 Baturina Street, Ivanovo

Website
- www.ivoblduma.ru

The Ivanovo Oblast Duma (Russian: Ивановская областная дума, romanized: Ivanovskaya oblastnaya duma) is the regional parliament of Ivanovo Oblast, a federal subject of Russia. A total of 26 deputies are elected for five-year terms.

== Elections ==
=== 2018 ===
Party	%	Seats
United Russia	34.14	15
Communist Party of the Russian Federation	26.92	7
Liberal Democratic Party of Russia	16.33	2
A Just Russia	8.22	2
Russian Party of Pensioners for Social Justice	4.45	0
Communists of Russia	3.40	0
Russian Party of Freedom and Justice	1.97	0
Rodina	0.92	0
Registered voters/turnout	32.86	

=== 2023 ===
Party	%	Seats
United Russia	65.39	27
Liberal Democratic Party of Russia	10.08	2
Communist Party of the Russian Federation	9.86	1
Registered voters/turnout	33.87	

== List of chairmen ==
The chairman of the Ivanovo Oblast Duma is the presiding officer of the duma.

Below is a list of office-holders:

Name	Took office	Left office
Vladislav Tikhomirov	March 1994	February 1996
Valery Nikologorsky	February 1996	December 2000
Vladimir Grishin	December 2000	February 2003
Pavel Konkov	February 2003	November 2004
Vladimir Grishin	November 2004	December 2005
Andrei Nazarov	December 2005	March 2008
Sergey Pachomov	March 20, 2008	—
