= Annenskoye =

Annenskoye Анненское
- Village
- Location within Ivanovo Oblast Location within Russia
- Coordinates: 57°17′N 41°19′E
- Country: Russia
- Region: Ivanovo Oblast
- District: Privolzhsky District
- Time zone: UTC+3:00

Annenskoye (Russian: Анненское) is a rural locality (a village) in Privolzhsky District, Ivanovo Oblast, Russia. Population: 6 (2010 census);

== Geography ==
This rural locality is located 10 kilometres (6.2 mi) from Privolzhsk (the district's administrative centre), 40 kilometres (25 mi) from Ivanovo (capital of Ivanovo Oblast) and 281 kilometres (175 mi) from Moscow. Polozishche is the nearest rural locality.
