= Ryspayevo =

Ryspayevo Рыспаево
- Village
- Location within Ivanovo Oblast Location within Russia
- Coordinates: 57°20′N 41°14′E
- Country: Russia
- Region: Ivanovo Oblast
- District: Privolzhsky District
- Time zone: UTC+3:00

Ryspayevo (Russian: Рыспаево) is a rural locality (a village) in Privolzhsky District, Ivanovo Oblast, Russia. Population: 6 (2010 census);

== Geography ==
This rural locality is located 6 kilometres (3.7 mi) from Privolzhsk (the district's administrative centre), 42 kilometres (26 mi) from Ivanovo (capital of Ivanovo Oblast) and 280 kilometres (170 mi) from Moscow. Kudelikha is the nearest rural locality.
