= Vasilevo, Privolzhsky District, Ivanovo Oblast =

Vasilevo Василево
- Village
- Location within Ivanovo Oblast Location within Russia
- Coordinates: 57°21′N 41°17′E
- Country: Russia
- Region: Ivanovo Oblast
- District: Privolzhsky District
- Time zone: UTC+3:00

Vasilevo (Russian: Василево) is a rural locality (a village) in Privolzhsky District, Ivanovo Oblast, Russia. Population: 145 (2010 census);

== Geography ==
This rural locality is located 2 kilometres (1.2 mi) from Privolzhsk (the district's administrative centre), 46 kilometres (29 mi) from Ivanovo (capital of Ivanovo Oblast) and 284 kilometres (176 mi) from Moscow. Kolyshino is the nearest rural locality.
