= Polozishche =

Polozishche Полозище
- Village
- Location within Ivanovo Oblast Location within Russia
- Coordinates: 57°16′N 41°20′E
- Country: Russia
- Region: Ivanovo Oblast
- District: Privolzhsky District
- Time zone: UTC+3:00

Polozishche (Russian: Полозище) is a rural locality (a village) in Privolzhsky District, Ivanovo Oblast, Russia. Population: 23 (2010 census);

== Geography ==
This rural locality is located 11 kilometres (6.8 mi) from Privolzhsk (the district's administrative centre), 39 kilometres (24 mi) from Ivanovo (capital of Ivanovo Oblast) and 281 kilometres (175 mi) from Moscow. Posedovo is the nearest rural locality.
