= Tserkovnoye =

Tserkovnoye Церковное
- Village
- Location within Ivanovo Oblast Location within Russia
- Coordinates: 57°26′N 41°31′E
- Country: Russia
- Region: Ivanovo Oblast
- District: Privolzhsky District
- Time zone: UTC+3:00

Tserkovnoye (Russian: Церковное) is a rural locality (a village) in Privolzhsky District, Ivanovo Oblast, Russia. Population: 7 (2010 census);

== Geography ==
This rural locality is located 15 kilometres (9.3 mi) from Privolzhsk (the district's administrative centre), 60 kilometres (37 mi) from Ivanovo (capital of Ivanovo Oblast) and 3,000 kilometres (1,900 mi) from Moscow. Levashikha is the nearest rural locality.
