= Sandyrevo =

Sandyrevo Сандырево
- Village
- Location within Ivanovo Oblast Location within Russia
- Coordinates: 57°18′N 41°14′E
- Country: Russia
- Region: Ivanovo Oblast
- District: Privolzhsky District
- Time zone: UTC+3:00

Sandyrevo (Russian: Сандырево) is a rural locality (a village) in Privolzhsky District, Ivanovo Oblast, Russia. Population: 23 (2010 census);

== Geography ==
This rural locality is located 8 kilometres (5.0 mi) from Privolzhsk (the district's administrative centre), 39 kilometres (24 mi) from Ivanovo (capital of Ivanovo Oblast) and 278 kilometres (173 mi) from Moscow. Ivanovskoye is the nearest rural locality.
