= Popkovo =

Popkovo Попково
- Village
- Location within Ivanovo Oblast Location within Russia
- Coordinates: 57°25′N 41°27′E
- Country: Russia
- Region: Ivanovo Oblast
- District: Privolzhsky District
- Time zone: UTC+3:00

Popkovo (Russian: Попково) is a rural locality (a village) in Privolzhsky District, Ivanovo Oblast, Russia. Population: 11 (2010 census);

== Geography ==
This rural locality is located 11 kilometres (6.8 mi) from Privolzhsk (the district's administrative centre), 57 kilometres (35 mi) from Ivanovo (capital of Ivanovo Oblast) and 296 kilometres (184 mi) from Moscow. Kasimovka is the nearest rural locality.
