= Korovino, Privolzhsky District, Ivanovo Oblast =

Korovino Коровино
- Village
- Location within Ivanovo Oblast Location within Russia
- Coordinates: 57°17′N 41°21′E
- Country: Russia
- Region: Ivanovo Oblast
- District: Privolzhsky District
- Time zone: UTC+3:00

Korovino (Russian: Коровино) is a rural locality (a village) in Privolzhsky District, Ivanovo Oblast, Russia. Population: 11 (2010 census);

== Geography ==
This rural locality is located 10 kilometres (6.2 mi) from Privolzhsk (the district's administrative centre), 41 kilometres (25 mi) from Ivanovo (capital of Ivanovo Oblast) and 283 kilometres (176 mi) from Moscow. Ukladnitsy is the nearest rural locality.
