= Rylkovo, Privolzhsky District, Ivanovo Oblast =

Rylkovo Рылково
- Village
- Location within Ivanovo Oblast Location within Russia
- Coordinates: 57°23′N 41°13′E
- Country: Russia
- Region: Ivanovo Oblast
- District: Privolzhsky District
- Time zone: UTC+3:00

Rylkovo (Russian: Рылково) is a rural locality (a village) in Privolzhsky District, Ivanovo Oblast, Russia. Population: 14 (2010 census);

== Geography ==
This rural locality is located 5 kilometres (3.1 mi) from Privolzhsk (the district's administrative centre), 48 kilometres (30 mi) from Ivanovo (capital of Ivanovo Oblast) and 283 kilometres (176 mi) from Moscow. Vasilyevskoye is the nearest rural locality.
