= Peremilovo, Privolzhsky District, Ivanovo Oblast =

Peremilovo Перемилово
- Village
- Location within Ivanovo Oblast Location within Russia
- Coordinates: 57°15′N 41°30′E
- Country: Russia
- Region: Ivanovo Oblast
- District: Privolzhsky District
- Time zone: UTC+3:00

Peremilovo (Russian: Перемилово) is a rural locality (a village) in Privolzhsky District, Ivanovo Oblast, Russia. Population: 8 (2010 census);

== Geography ==
This rural locality is located 19 kilometres (12 mi) from Privolzhsk (the district's administrative centre), 44 kilometres (27 mi) from Ivanovo (capital of Ivanovo Oblast) and 287 kilometres (178 mi) from Moscow. Vanino is the nearest rural locality.
