= Drachevo, Ivanovo Oblast =

Drachevo Драчево
- Village
- Location within Ivanovo Oblast Location within Russia
- Coordinates: 57°15′N 41°23′E
- Country: Russia
- Region: Ivanovo Oblast
- District: Privolzhsky District
- Time zone: UTC+3:00

Drachevo (Russian: Драчево) is a rural locality (a village) in Privolzhsky District, Ivanovo Oblast, Russia. Population: 7 (2010 census);

== Geography ==
This rural locality is located 14 kilometres (8.7 mi) from Privolzhsk (the district's administrative centre), 39 kilometres (24 mi) from Ivanovo (capital of Ivanovo Oblast) and 282 kilometres (175 mi) from Moscow. Rozhdestvenno is the nearest rural locality.
