= Shiryaikha, Privolzhsky District, Ivanovo Oblast =

Shiryaikha Ширяиха
- Village
- Location within Ivanovo Oblast Location within Russia
- Coordinates: 57°22′N 41°15′E
- Country: Russia
- Region: Ivanovo Oblast
- District: Privolzhsky District
- Time zone: UTC+3:00

Shiryaikha (Russian: Ширяиха) is a rural locality (a village) in Privolzhsky District, Ivanovo Oblast, Russia. Population: 38 (2010 census);

== Geography ==
This rural locality is located 3 kilometres (1.9 mi) from Privolzhsk (the district's administrative centre), 45 kilometres (28 mi) from Ivanovo (capital of Ivanovo Oblast) and 282 kilometres (175 mi) from Moscow. Leshchyovo is the nearest rural locality.
