= Vaskin Potok =

Vaskin Potok Васькин Поток
- Village
- Location within Ivanovo Oblast Location within Russia
- Coordinates: 57°24′N 41°17′E
- Country: Russia
- Region: Ivanovo Oblast
- District: Privolzhsky District
- Time zone: UTC+3:00

Vaskin Potok (Russian: Васькин Поток) is a rural locality (a village) in Privolzhsky District, Ivanovo Oblast, Russia. Population: 144 (2010 census);

== Geography ==
This rural locality is located 3 kilometres (1.9 mi) from Privolzhsk (the district's administrative centre), 50 kilometres (31 mi) from Ivanovo (capital of Ivanovo Oblast) and 286 kilometres (178 mi) from Moscow. Ingar is the nearest rural locality.
