= Milovka, Ivanovo Oblast =

Milovka Миловка
- Village
- Location within Ivanovo Oblast Location within Russia
- Coordinates: 57°27′N 41°28′E
- Country: Russia
- Region: Ivanovo Oblast
- District: Privolzhsky District
- Time zone: UTC+3:00

Milovka (Russian: Миловка) is a rural locality (a selo) in Privolzhsky District, Ivanovo Oblast, Russia. Population: 32 (2010 census);

== Geography ==
This rural locality is located 14 kilometres (8.7 mi) from Privolzhsk (the district's administrative centre), 61 kilometres (38 mi) from Ivanovo (capital of Ivanovo Oblast) and 299 kilometres (186 mi) from Moscow. Rusinovo is the nearest rural locality.
