= Sarayevo, Ivanovo Oblast =

Sarayevo Сараево
- Village
- Location within Ivanovo Oblast Location within Russia
- Coordinates: 57°12′N 41°23′E
- Country: Russia
- Region: Ivanovo Oblast
- District: Privolzhsky District
- Time zone: UTC+3:00

Sarayevo (Russian: Сараево) is a rural locality (a selo) in Privolzhsky District, Ivanovo Oblast, Russia. Population: 118 (2010 census);

== Geography ==
This rural locality is located 20 kilometres (12 mi) from Privolzhsk (the district's administrative centre), 35 kilometres (22 mi) from Ivanovo (capital of Ivanovo Oblast) and 279 kilometres (173 mi) from Moscow. Vasilchinino is the nearest rural locality.
