= Gorki-Chirikovy =

Gorki-Chirikovy Горки-Чириковы
- Village
- Location within Ivanovo Oblast Location within Russia
- Coordinates: 57°18′N 41°29′E
- Country: Russia
- Region: Ivanovo Oblast
- District: Privolzhsky District
- Time zone: UTC+3:00

Gorki-Chirikovy (Russian: Горки-Чириковы) is a rural locality (a selo) in Privolzhsky District, Ivanovo Oblast, Russia. Population: 354 (2010 census);

== Geography ==
This rural locality is located 14 kilometres (8.7 mi) from Privolzhsk (the district's administrative centre), 47 kilometres (29 mi) from Ivanovo (capital of Ivanovo Oblast) and 290 kilometres (180 mi) from Moscow. Kosikovo is the nearest rural locality.
