= Kotelnitsy =

Kotelnitsy Котельницы
- Village
- Location within Ivanovo Oblast Location within Russia
- Coordinates: 57°18′N 41°28′E
- Country: Russia
- Region: Ivanovo Oblast
- District: Privolzhsky District
- Time zone: UTC+3:00

Kotelnitsy (Russian: Котельницы) is a rural locality (a village) in Privolzhsky District, Ivanovo Oblast, Russia. Population: 8 (2010 census);

== Geography ==
This rural locality is located 14 kilometres (8.7 mi) from Privolzhsk (the district's administrative centre), 46 kilometres (29 mi) from Ivanovo (capital of Ivanovo Oblast) and 289 kilometres (180 mi) from Moscow. Gorki Chirikovy is the nearest rural locality.
