= Antonovo, Ivanovo Oblast =

Antonovo Антоново
- Village
- Location within Ivanovo Oblast Location within Russia
- Coordinates: 57°20′N 41°29′E
- Country: Russia
- Region: Ivanovo Oblast
- District: Privolzhsky District
- Time zone: UTC+3:00

Antonovo (Russian: Антоново) is a rural locality (a village) in Privolzhsky District, Ivanovo Oblast, Russia. Population: 12 (2010 census);

== Geography ==
This rural locality is located 12 kilometres (7.5 mi) from Privolzhsk (the district's administrative centre), 49 kilometres (30 mi) from Ivanovo (capital of Ivanovo Oblast) and 291 kilometres (181 mi) from Moscow. Kosikovo is the nearest rural locality.
