= Ivashkovo, Privolzhsky District, Ivanovo Oblast =

Ivashkovo Ивашково
- Village
- Location within Ivanovo Oblast Location within Russia
- Coordinates: 57°23′N 41°22′E
- Country: Russia
- Region: Ivanovo Oblast
- District: Privolzhsky District
- Time zone: UTC+3:00

Ivashkovo (Russian: Ивашково) is a rural locality (a village) in Privolzhsky District, Ivanovo Oblast, Russia. Population: 5 (2010 census);

== Geography ==
This rural locality is located 5 kilometres (3.1 mi) from Privolzhsk (the district's administrative centre), 51 kilometres (32 mi) from Ivanovo (capital of Ivanovo Oblast) and 290 kilometres (180 mi) from Moscow. Filisovo is the nearest rural locality.
