= Krenevo, Ivanovo Oblast =

Krenevo Кренево
- Village
- Location within Ivanovo Oblast Location within Russia
- Coordinates: 57°24′N 41°23′E
- Country: Russia
- Region: Ivanovo Oblast
- District: Privolzhsky District
- Time zone: UTC+3:00

Krenevo (Russian: Кренево) is a rural locality (a village) in Privolzhsky District, Ivanovo Oblast, Russia. Population: 18 (2010 census);

== Geography ==
This rural locality is located 7 kilometres (4.3 mi) from Privolzhsk (the district's administrative centre), 53 kilometres (33 mi) from Ivanovo (capital of Ivanovo Oblast) and 292 kilometres (181 mi) from Moscow. Churilovo is the nearest rural locality.
