= Nogino, Ivanovo Oblast =

Nogino Ногино
- Village
- Location within Ivanovo Oblast Location within Russia
- Coordinates: 57°23′N 41°28′E
- Country: Russia
- Region: Ivanovo Oblast
- District: Privolzhsky District
- Time zone: UTC+3:00

Nogino (Russian: Ногино) is a rural locality (a selo) in Privolzhsky District, Ivanovo Oblast, Russia. Population: 44 (2010 census);

== Geography ==
This rural locality is located 11 kilometres (6.8 mi) from Privolzhsk (the district's administrative centre), 54 kilometres (34 mi) from Ivanovo (capital of Ivanovo Oblast) and 294 kilometres (183 mi) from Moscow. Kozlovo is the nearest rural locality.
