= Gorki, Privolzhsky District, Ivanovo Oblast =

Gorki Горки
- Village
- Location within Ivanovo Oblast Location within Russia
- Coordinates: 57°23′N 41°21′E
- Country: Russia
- Region: Ivanovo Oblast
- District: Privolzhsky District
- Time zone: UTC+3:00

Gorki (Russian: Горки) is a rural locality (a village) in Privolzhsky District, Ivanovo Oblast, Russia. Population: 62 (2010 census);

== Geography ==
This rural locality is located 4 kilometres (2.5 mi) from Privolzhsk (the district's administrative centre), 50 kilometres (31 mi) from Ivanovo (capital of Ivanovo Oblast) and 289 kilometres (180 mi) from Moscow. Parushevo is the nearest rural locality.
