= Igolkovo =

Igolkovo Иголково
- Village
- Location within Ivanovo Oblast Location within Russia
- Coordinates: 57°18′N 41°24′E
- Country: Russia
- Region: Ivanovo Oblast
- District: Privolzhsky District
- Time zone: UTC+3:00

Igolkovo (Russian: Иголково) is a rural locality (a village) in Privolzhsky District, Ivanovo Oblast, Russia. Population: 8 (2010 census);

== Geography ==
This rural locality is located 10 kilometres (6.2 mi) from Privolzhsk (the district's administrative centre), 44 kilometres (27 mi) from Ivanovo (capital of Ivanovo Oblast) and 285 kilometres (177 mi) from Moscow. Polutikha is the nearest rural locality.
