= Sherbinino =

Sherbinino Шербинино
- Village
- Location within Ivanovo Oblast Location within Russia
- Coordinates: 57°14′N 41°22′E
- Country: Russia
- Region: Ivanovo Oblast
- District: Privolzhsky District
- Time zone: UTC+3:00

Sherbinino (Russian: Шербинино) is a rural locality (a village) in Privolzhsky District, Ivanovo Oblast, Russia. Population: 40 (2010 census);

== Geography ==
This rural locality is located 16 kilometres (9.9 mi) from Privolzhsk (the district's administrative centre), 37 kilometres (23 mi) from Ivanovo (capital of Ivanovo Oblast) and 280 kilometres (170 mi) from Moscow. Gryazki is the nearest rural locality.
