= Severtsevo =

Severtsevo Северцево
- Village
- Location within Ivanovo Oblast Location within Russia
- Coordinates: 57°27′N 41°29′E
- Country: Russia
- Region: Ivanovo Oblast
- District: Privolzhsky District
- Time zone: UTC+3:00

Severtsevo (Russian: Северцево) is a rural locality (a selo) in Privolzhsky District, Ivanovo Oblast, Russia. Population: 635 (2010 census);

== Geography ==
This rural locality is located 14 kilometres (8.7 mi) from Privolzhsk (the district's administrative centre), 60 kilometres (37 mi) from Ivanovo (capital of Ivanovo Oblast) and 299 kilometres (186 mi) from Moscow. Plyos is the nearest rural locality.
