= Gryazki =

Gryazki Грязки
- Village
- Location within Ivanovo Oblast Location within Russia
- Coordinates: 57°14′N 41°23′E
- Country: Russia
- Region: Ivanovo Oblast
- District: Privolzhsky District
- Time zone: UTC+3:00

Gryazki (Russian: Грязки) is a rural locality (a village) in Privolzhsky District, Ivanovo Oblast, Russia. Its population was 25 (2010 census).

== Geography ==
This rural locality is located 17 kilometres (11 mi) from Privolzhsk (the district's administrative centre), 37 kilometres (23 mi) from Ivanovo (the capital of Ivanovo Oblast) and 280 kilometres (170 mi) from Moscow. Shcherbinino is the nearest rural locality.
