= Ingar, Ivanovo Oblast =

Ingar Ингарь
- Village
- Location within Ivanovo Oblast Location within Russia
- Coordinates: 57°23′N 41°18′E
- Country: Russia
- Region: Ivanovo Oblast
- District: Privolzhsky District
- Time zone: UTC+3:00

Ingar (Russian: Ингарь) is a rural locality (a selo) in Privolzhsky District, Ivanovo Oblast, Russia. Population: 1,118 (2010 census);

== Geography ==
This rural locality is located 2 kilometres (1.2 mi) from Privolzhsk (the district's administrative centre), 49 kilometres (30 mi) from Ivanovo (capital of Ivanovo Oblast) and 287 kilometres (178 mi) from Moscow. Dudkino is the nearest rural locality.
