= Tolpygino =

Tolpygino Толпыгино
- Village
- Location within Ivanovo Oblast Location within Russia
- Coordinates: 57°19′N 41°14′E
- Country: Russia
- Region: Ivanovo Oblast
- District: Privolzhsky District
- Time zone: UTC+3:00

Tolpygino (Russian: Толпыгино) is a rural locality (a selo) in Privolzhsky District, Ivanovo Oblast, Russia. Population: 534 (2010 census);

== Geography ==
This rural locality is located 7 kilometres (4.3 mi) from Privolzhsk (the district's administrative centre), 41 kilometres (25 mi) from Ivanovo (capital of Ivanovo Oblast) and 279 kilometres (173 mi) from Moscow. Ryspayevo is the nearest rural locality.
