= Vygolovo =

Vygolovo Выголово
- Village
- Location within Ivanovo Oblast Location within Russia
- Coordinates: 57°27′N 41°26′E
- Country: Russia
- Region: Ivanovo Oblast
- District: Privolzhsky District
- Time zone: UTC+3:00

Vygolovo (Russian: Выголово) is a rural locality (a village) in Privolzhsky District, Ivanovo Oblast, Russia. Population: 18 (2010 census);

== Geography ==
This rural locality is located 12 kilometres (7.5 mi) from Privolzhsk (the district's administrative centre), 58 kilometres (36 mi) from Ivanovo (capital of Ivanovo Oblast) and 297 kilometres (185 mi) from Moscow. Popkovo is the nearest rural locality.
