= Poverstnoye =

Poverstnoye Поверстное
- Village
- Location within Ivanovo Oblast Location within Russia
- Coordinates: 57°22′N 41°31′E
- Country: Russia
- Region: Ivanovo Oblast
- District: Privolzhsky District
- Time zone: UTC+3:00

Poverstnoye (Russian: Поверстное) is a rural locality (a selo) in Privolzhsky District, Ivanovo Oblast, Russia. Population: 198 (2010 census);

== Geography ==
This rural locality is located 13 kilometres (8.1 mi) from Privolzhsk (the district's administrative centre), 54 kilometres (34 mi) from Ivanovo (capital of Ivanovo Oblast) and 295 kilometres (183 mi) from Moscow. Kozlovo is the nearest rural locality.
