= Rozhdestvenno, Ivanovo Oblast =

Rozhdestvenno Рождествено
- Village
- Location within Ivanovo Oblast Location within Russia
- Coordinates: 57°15′N 41°22′E
- Country: Russia
- Region: Ivanovo Oblast
- District: Privolzhsky District
- Time zone: UTC+3:00

Rozhdestvenno (Russian: Рождествено) is a rural locality (a selo) in Privolzhsky District, Ivanovo Oblast, Russia. Population: 334 (2010 census);

== Geography ==
This rural locality is located 15 kilometres (9.3 mi) from Privolzhsk (the district's administrative centre), 38 kilometres (24 mi) from Ivanovo (capital of Ivanovo Oblast) and 281 kilometres (175 mi) from Moscow. Drachevo is the nearest rural locality.
