= Ukladnitsy =

Ukladnitsy Укладницы
- Village
- Location within Ivanovo Oblast Location within Russia
- Coordinates: 57°16′N 41°21′E
- Country: Russia
- Region: Ivanovo Oblast
- District: Privolzhsky District
- Time zone: UTC+3:00

Ukladnitsy (Russian: Укладницы) is a rural locality (a village) in Privolzhsky District, Ivanovo Oblast, Russia. Population: 8 (2010 census);

== Geography ==
This rural locality is located 11 kilometres (6.8 mi) from Privolzhsk (the district's administrative centre), 40 kilometres (25 mi) from Ivanovo (capital of Ivanovo Oblast) and 282 kilometres (175 mi) from Moscow. Posedovo is the nearest rural locality.
