= Penki, Privolzhsky District, Ivanovo Oblast =

Penki Пеньки
- Village
- Location within Ivanovo Oblast Location within Russia
- Coordinates: 57°24′N 41°36′E
- Country: Russia
- Region: Ivanovo Oblast
- District: Privolzhsky District
- Time zone: UTC+3:00

Penki (Russian: Пеньки) is a rural locality (a selo) in Privolzhsky District, Ivanovo Oblast, Russia. Population: 72 (2010 census);

== Geography ==
This rural locality is located 19 kilometres (12 mi) from Privolzhsk (the district's administrative centre), 61 kilometres (38 mi) from Ivanovo (capital of Ivanovo Oblast) and 302 kilometres (188 mi) from Moscow. Klimovo is the nearest rural locality.
