= Filisovo, Privolzhsky District, Ivanovo Oblast =

Filisovo Филисово
- Village
- Location within Ivanovo Oblast Location within Russia
- Coordinates: 57°24′N 41°23′E
- Country: Russia
- Region: Ivanovo Oblast
- District: Privolzhsky District
- Time zone: UTC+3:00

Filisovo (Russian: Филисово) is a rural locality (a village) in Privolzhsky District, Ivanovo Oblast, Russia. Population: 116 (2010 census);

== Geography ==
This rural locality is located 6 kilometres (3.7 mi) from Privolzhsk (the district's administrative centre), 52 kilometres (32 mi) from Ivanovo (capital of Ivanovo Oblast) and 291 kilometres (181 mi) from Moscow. Ivashkovo is the nearest rural locality.
