= Kosikovo, Privolzhsky District, Ivanovo Oblast =

Kosikovo Косиково
- Village
- Location within Ivanovo Oblast Location within Russia
- Coordinates: 57°19′N 41°29′E
- Country: Russia
- Region: Ivanovo Oblast
- District: Privolzhsky District
- Time zone: UTC+3:00

Kosikovo (Russian: Косиково) is a rural locality (a village) in Privolzhsky District, Ivanovo Oblast, Russia. Population: 30 (2010 census);

== Geography ==
This rural locality is located 14 kilometres (8.7 mi) from Privolzhsk (the district's administrative centre), 48 kilometres (30 mi) from Ivanovo (capital of Ivanovo Oblast) and 291 kilometres (181 mi) from Moscow. Gorki Chirikovy is the nearest rural locality.
