= Stolovo =

Stolovo Столово
- Village
- Location within Ivanovo Oblast Location within Russia
- Coordinates: 57°19′N 41°12′E
- Country: Russia
- Region: Ivanovo Oblast
- District: Privolzhsky District
- Time zone: UTC+3:00

Stolovo (Russian: Столово) is a rural locality (a village) in Privolzhsky District, Ivanovo Oblast, Russia. Population: 6 (2010 census);

== Geography ==
This rural locality is located 8 kilometres (5.0 mi) from Privolzhsk (the district's administrative centre), 40 kilometres (25 mi) from Ivanovo (capital of Ivanovo Oblast) and 278 kilometres (173 mi) from Moscow. Tolpygino is the nearest rural locality.
