= Seliverstovo, Privolzhsky District, Ivanovo Oblast =

Seliverstovo Селиверстово
- Village
- Location within Ivanovo Oblast Location within Russia
- Coordinates: 57°11′N 41°21′E
- Country: Russia
- Region: Ivanovo Oblast
- District: Privolzhsky District
- Time zone: UTC+3:00

Seliverstovo (Russian: Селиверстово) is a rural locality (a village) in Privolzhsky District, Ivanovo Oblast, Russia. Population: 5 (2010 census);

== Geography ==
This rural locality is located 20 kilometres (12 mi) from Privolzhsk (the district's administrative centre), 33 kilometres (21 mi) from Ivanovo (capital of Ivanovo Oblast) and 277 kilometres (172 mi) from Moscow. Mikhalevo is the nearest rural locality.
