= Mitino, Ivanovo Oblast =

Mitino Митино
- Village
- Location within Ivanovo Oblast Location within Russia
- Coordinates: 57°19′N 41°25′E
- Country: Russia
- Region: Ivanovo Oblast
- District: Privolzhsky District
- Time zone: UTC+3:00

Mitino (Russian: Митино) is a rural locality (a village) in Privolzhsky District, Ivanovo Oblast, Russia. Population: 35 (2010 census);

== Geography ==
This rural locality is located 10 kilometres (6.2 mi) from Privolzhsk (the district's administrative centre), 47 kilometres (29 mi) from Ivanovo (capital of Ivanovo Oblast) and 288 kilometres (179 mi) from Moscow. Khrapunovo is the nearest rural locality.
