= Stulovo =

Stulovo Стулово
- Village
- Location within Ivanovo Oblast Location within Russia
- Coordinates: 57°15′N 42°30′E
- Country: Russia
- Region: Ivanovo Oblast
- District: Kineshemsky District
- Time zone: UTC+3:00

Stulovo (Russian: Стулово) is a rural locality (a village) in Kineshemsky District, Ivanovo Oblast, Russia. Population: 12 (2010 census);

== Geography ==
This rural locality is located 31 kilometres (19 mi) from Kineshma (the district's administrative centre), 97 kilometres (60 mi) from Ivanovo (capital of Ivanovo Oblast) and 339 kilometres (211 mi) from Moscow. Mitino is the nearest rural locality.
