= Plyos, Ivanovo Oblast =

Town in Ivanovo Oblast, Russia

Plyos Плёс
- Town
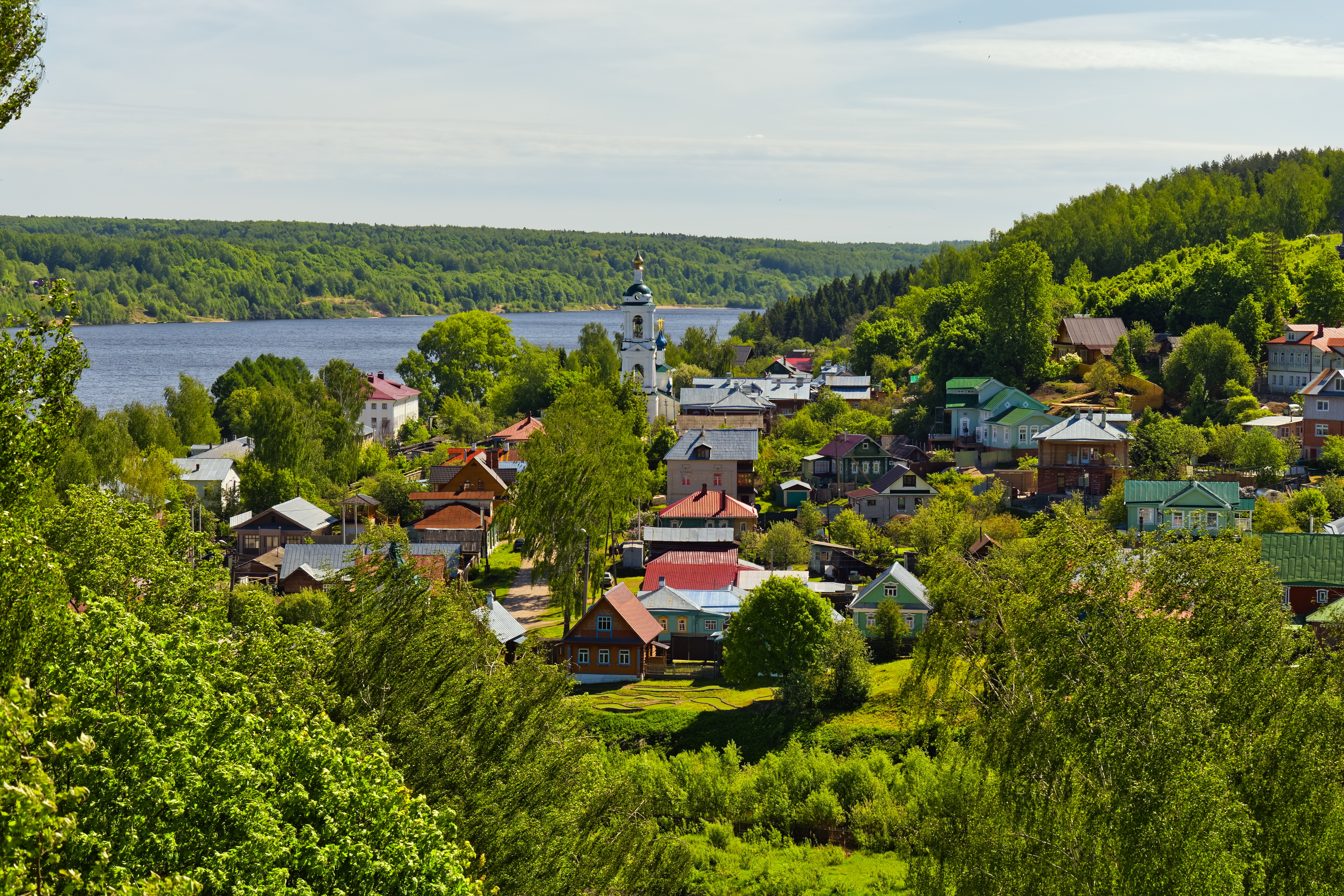
- View of Plyos

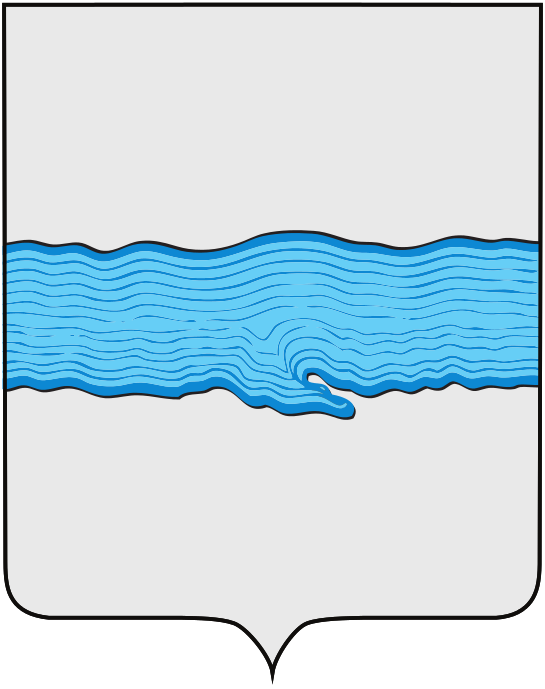
- Flag Coat of arms
- Interactive map of Plyos
- Location of Plyos Plyos (Ivanovo Oblast)
- Coordinates: 57°27′N 41°30′E
- Country: Russia
- Federal subject: Ivanovo Oblast
- Administrative district: Privolzhsky District
- Founded: 1141
- Town status since: 1778
- Elevation: 140 m (460 ft)

Population (2010 Census)
  - Total: 2,340
  - Estimate (2025): 1,796 (−23.2%)

Municipal status
  - Municipal district: Privolzhsky Municipal District
  - Urban settlement: Plyosskoye Urban Settlement
  - Capital of: Plyosskoye Urban Settlement
- Time zone: UTC+3 (MSK)
- Postal code: 155555
- OKTMO ID: 24620104001
- Website: gorodples.ru

Plyos (Russian: Плёс) is a town in Privolzhsky District of Ivanovo Oblast, Russia, located on the right bank of the Volga River, 70 kilometers (43 mi) northeast of Ivanovo, the administrative center of the oblast. Population: 1,896 (2021 census); 2,340 (2010 census); 2,790 (2002 census); 4,053 (1989 Soviet census).

== Paleontology ==
Fossils of Early Triassic temnospondyls are known from Plyos. Wetlugasaurus angustifrons and Angusaurus weidenbaumi were found in the Lower Olenekian deposits.

== History ==
It was founded in 12th century. Some years later the Plyos fortress was founded. It was destroyed in 1238 by Mongols.

A border post of the Grand Duchy of Moscow was founded in 1410 by Vasily I. It was granted town status in 1925.

== Administrative and municipal status ==
Within the framework of administrative divisions, Plyos is subordinated to Privolzhsky District. Prior to the adoption of the Law #145-OZ On the Administrative-Territorial Division of Ivanovo Oblast in December 2010, it used to be incorporated separately as an administrative unit with the status equal to that of the districts.

As a municipal division, the town of Plyos, together with twenty-three rural localities in Privolzhsky District, is incorporated within Privolzhsky Municipal District as Plyosskoye Urban Settlement.

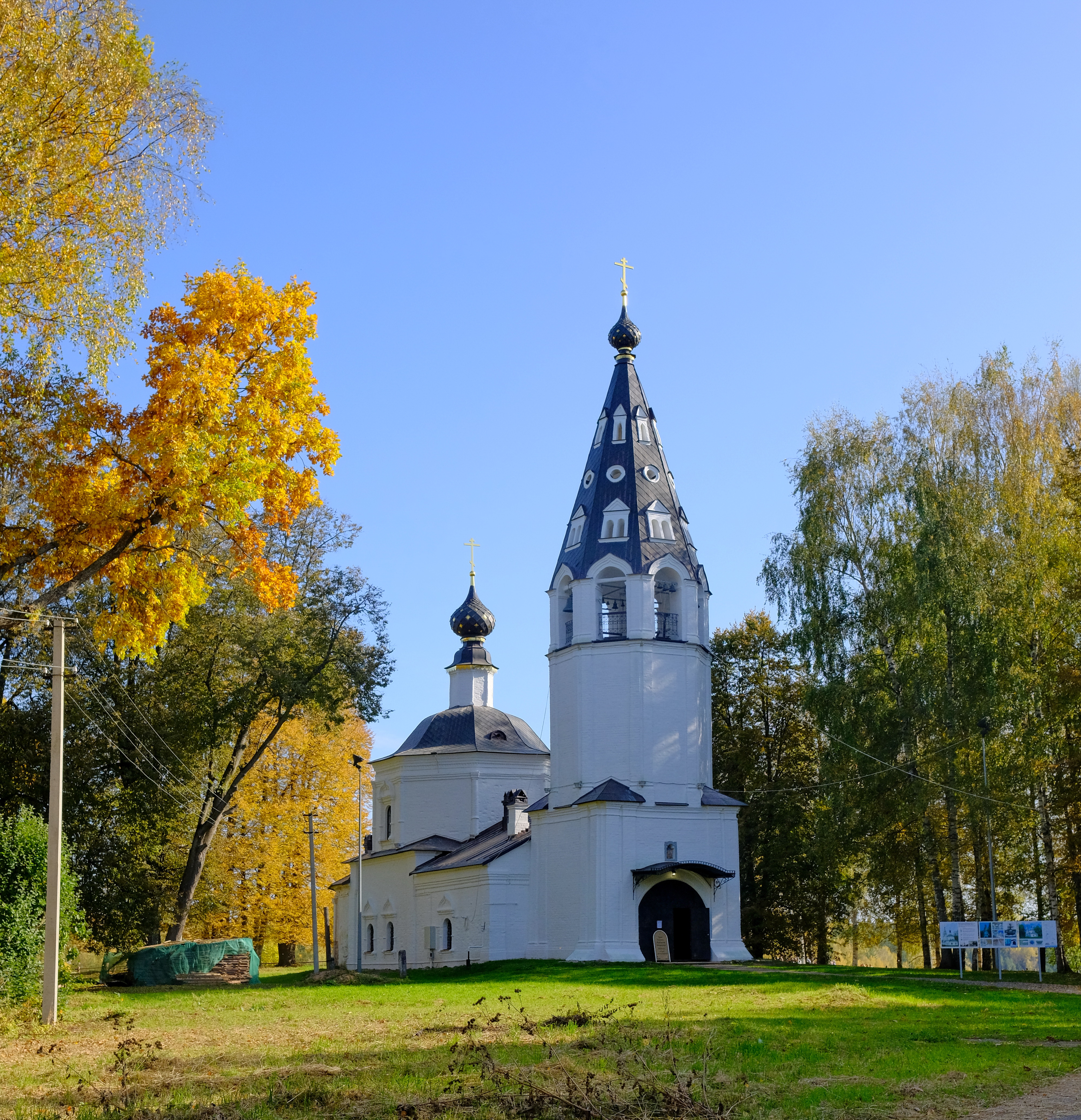
Assumption Church

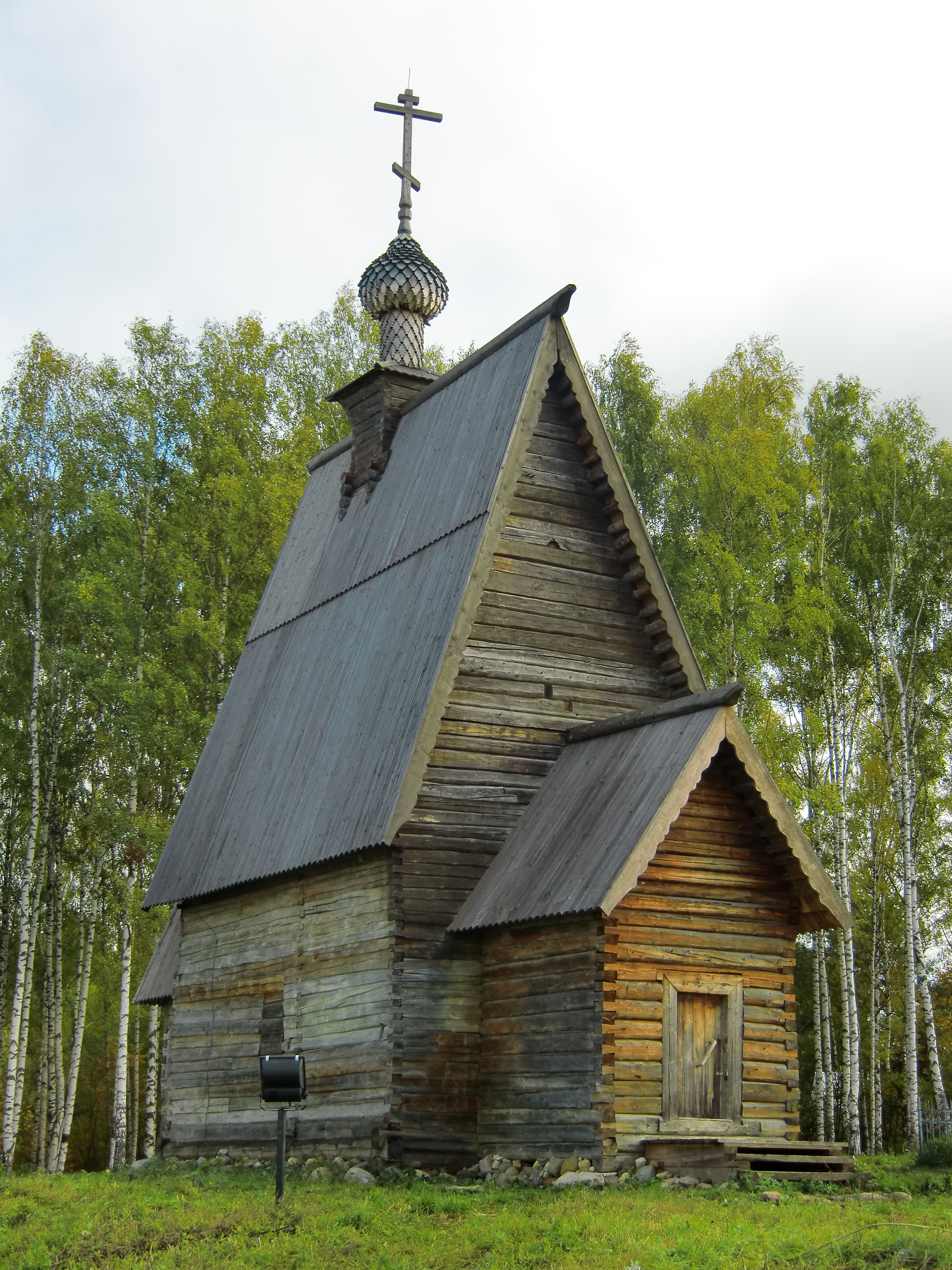
Wooden Church of the Resurrection

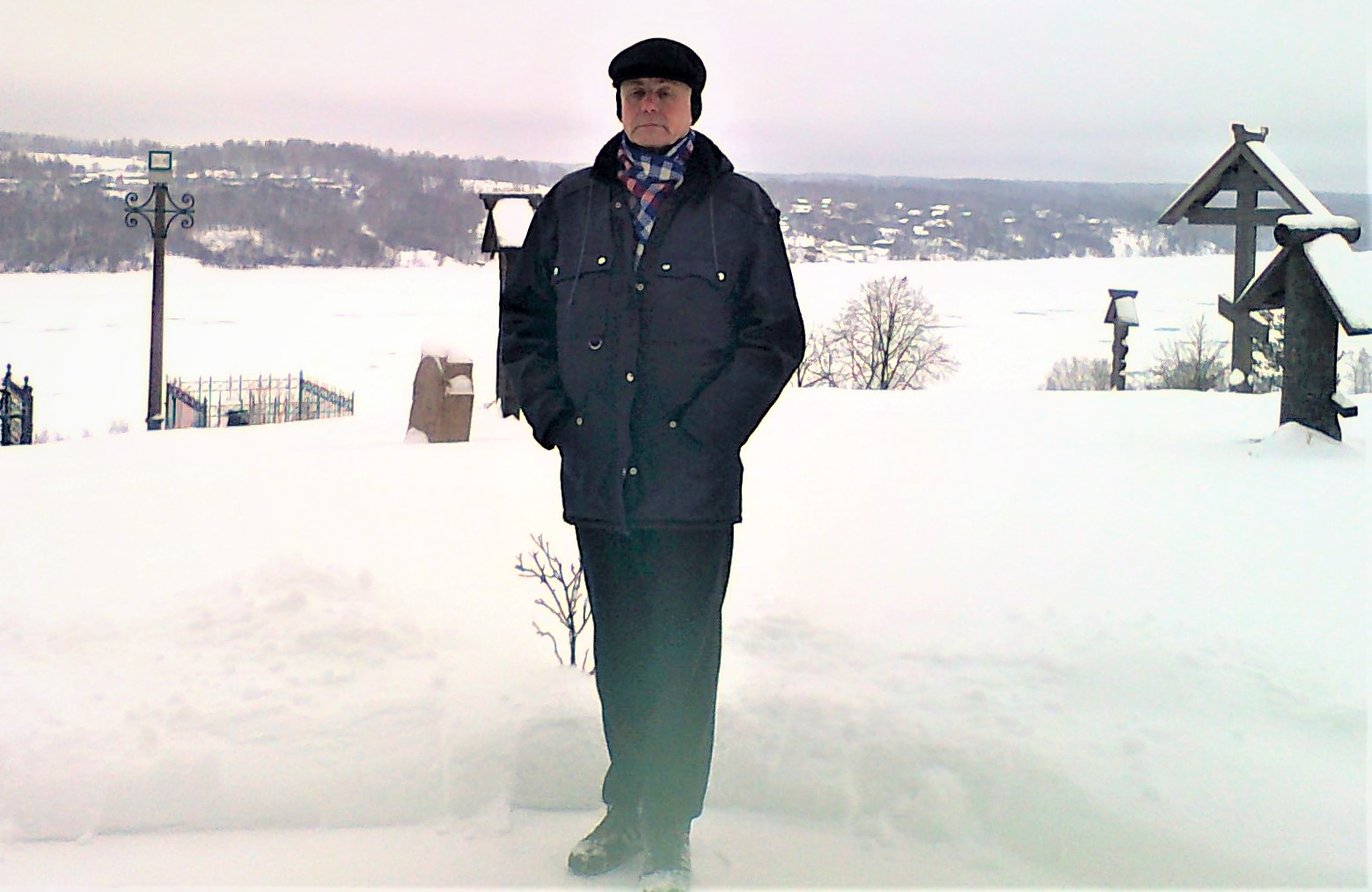
Cemetery of the Church of the Resurrection

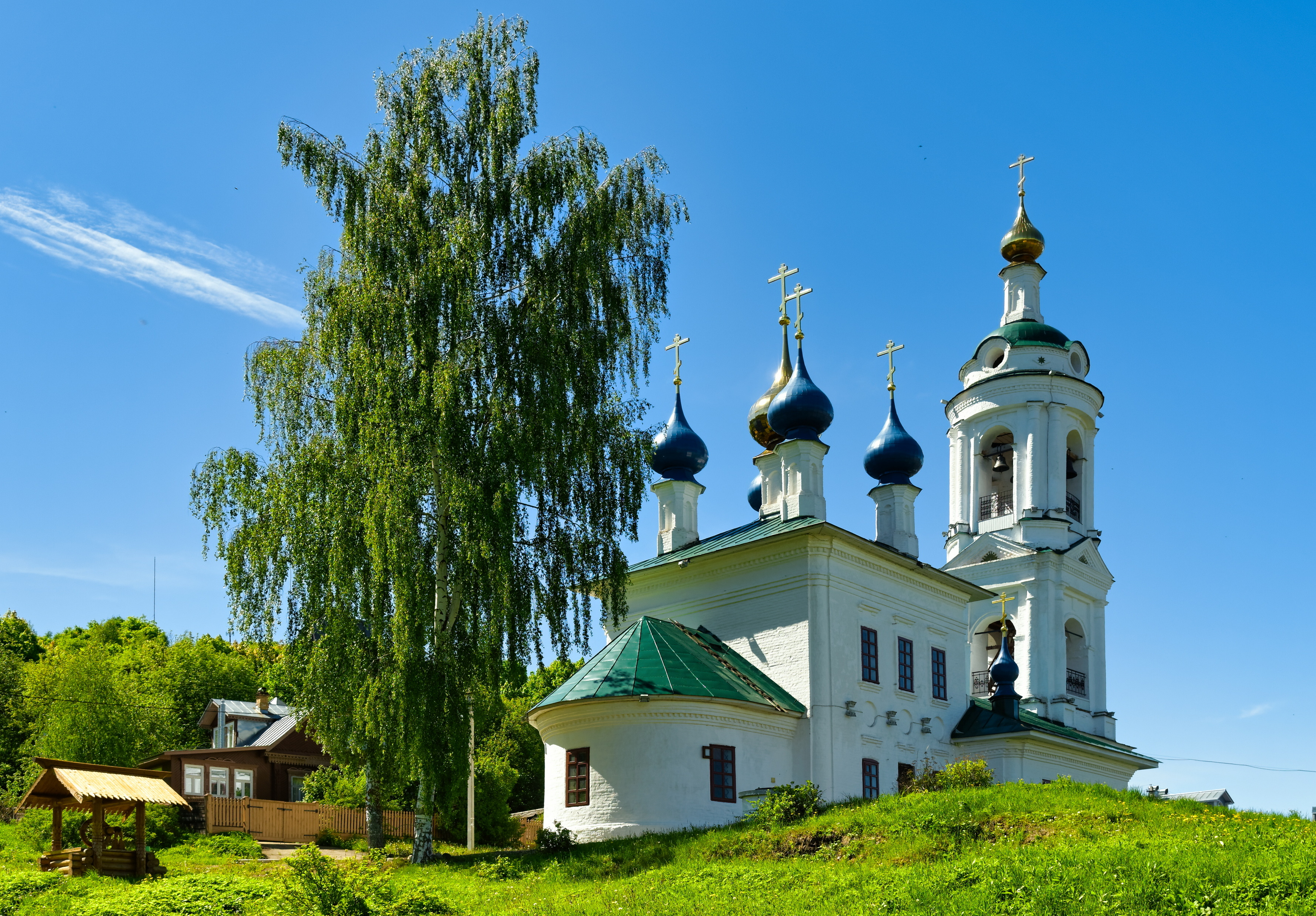
Church of St. Barbara

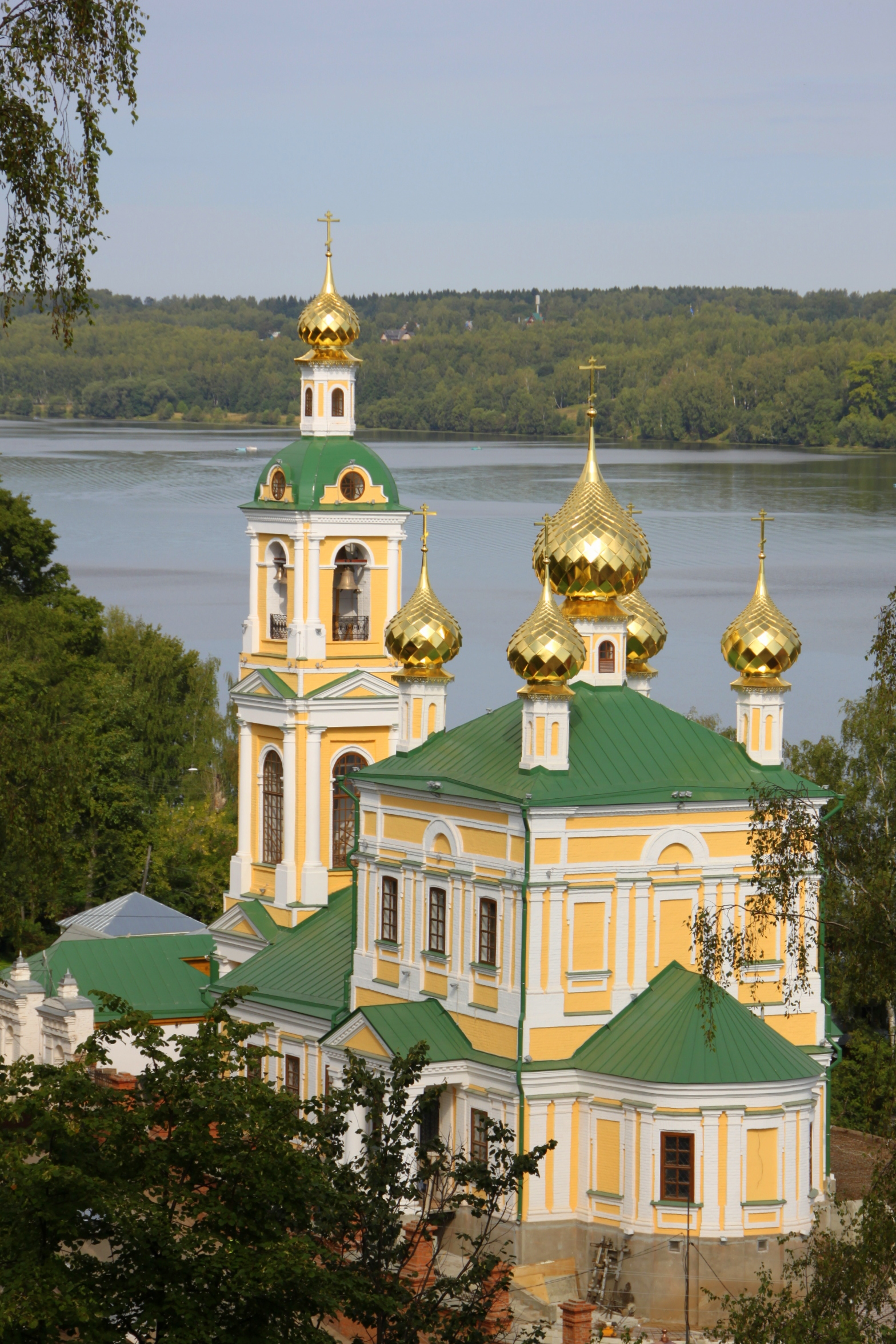
Church of the Resurrection

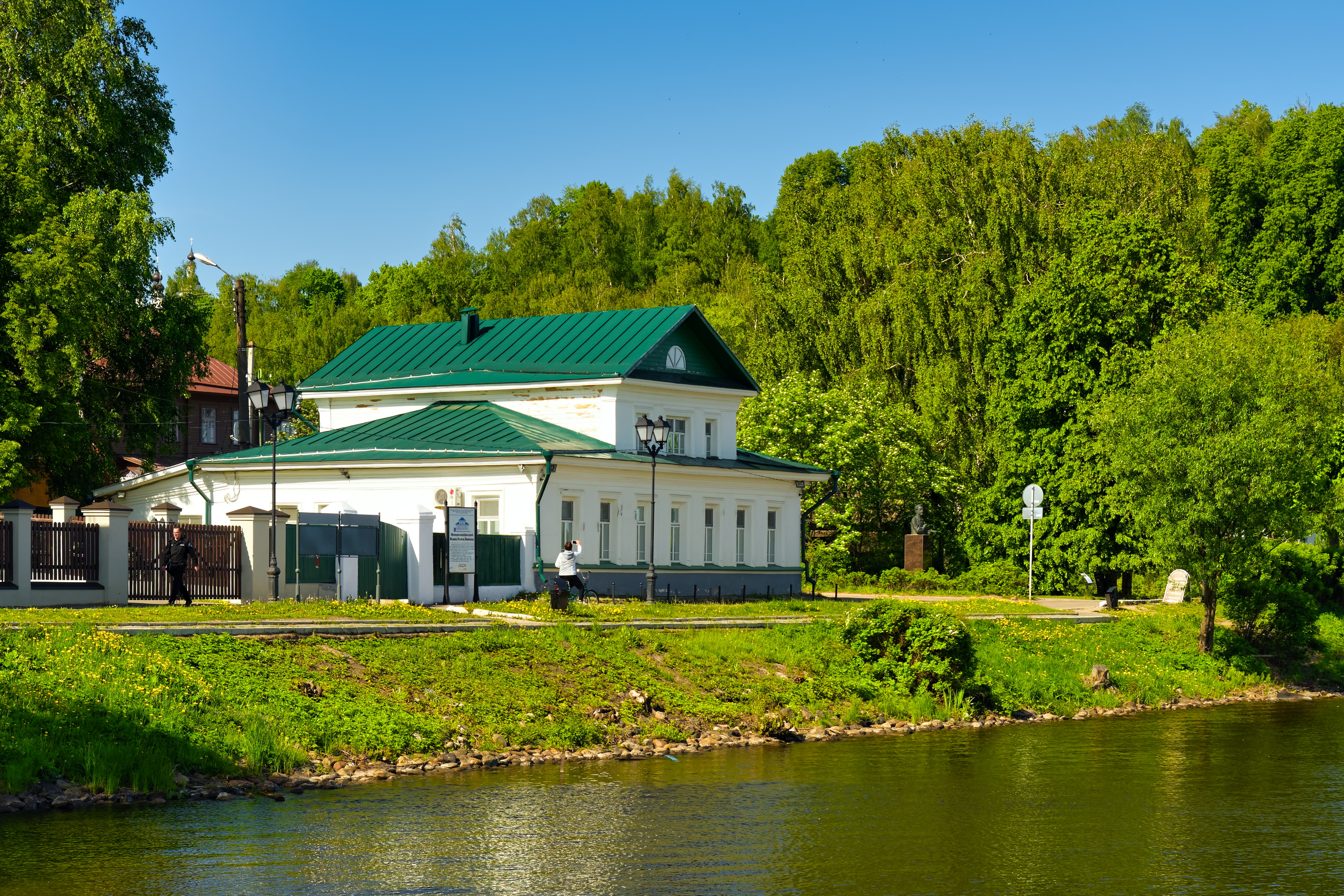
Isaac Levitan Museum

== See also ==
- Plyos State Museum-Reserve
