= Privolzhsky District, Ivanovo Oblast =

Privolzhsky District Приволжский район (Russian)
- District
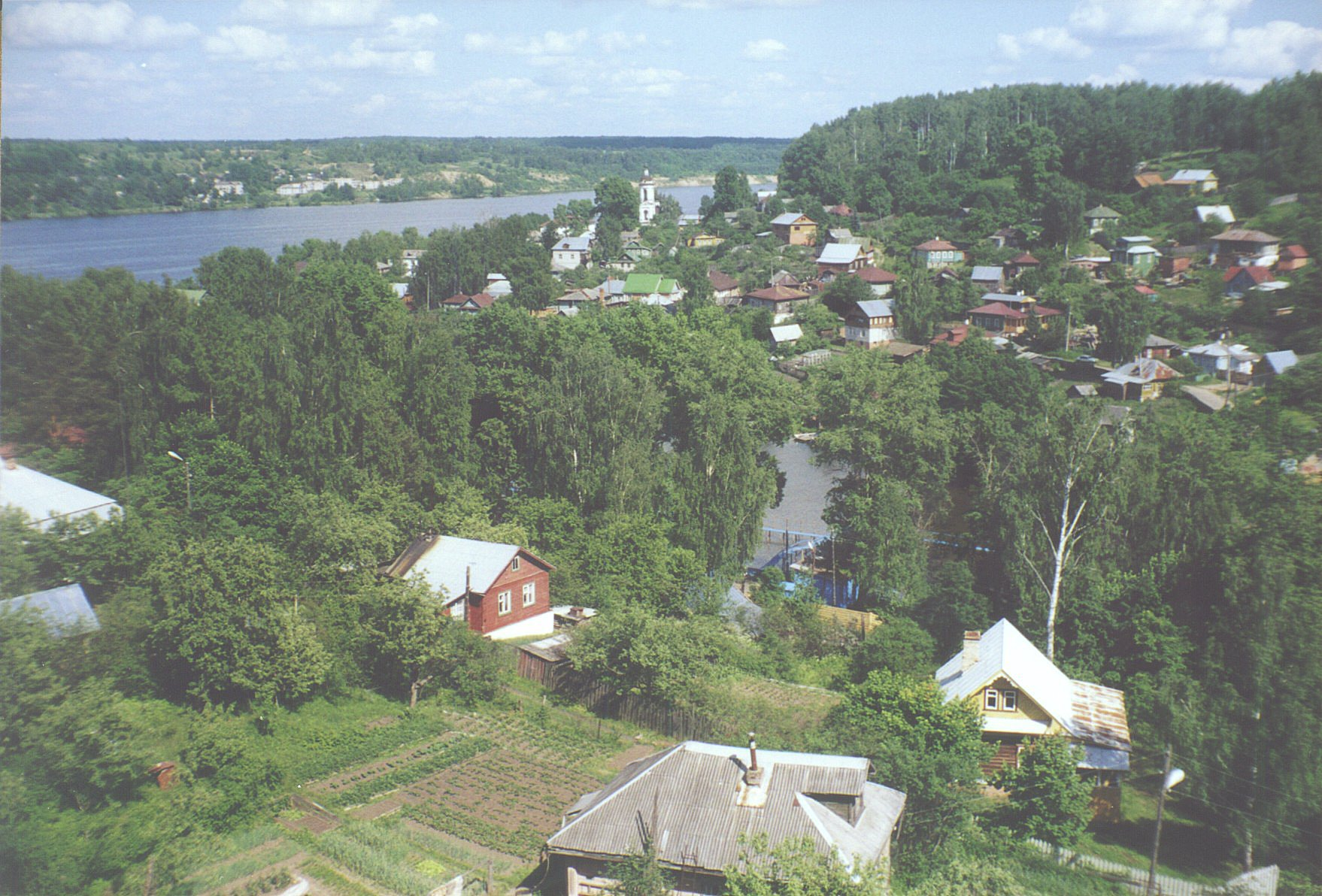
- Town of Plyos, Ivanovo Oblast

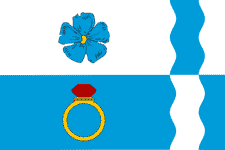
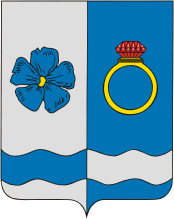
- Flag Coat of arms
- Location of Privolzhsky District in Ivanovo Oblast
- Coordinates: 57°23′N 41°17′E
- Country: Russia
- Federal subject: Ivanovo Oblast
- Administrative center: Privolzhsk

Area
  - Total: 600 km^{2} (230 sq mi)

Population (2010 Census)
  - Total: 26,327
  - Density: 44/km^{2} (110/sq mi)
  - Urban: 72.5%
  - Rural: 27.5%

Administrative structure
  - Inhabited localities: 2 cities/towns, 104 rural localities

Municipal structure
  - Municipally incorporated as: Privolzhsky Municipal District
  - Municipal divisions: 2 urban settlements, 3 rural settlements
- Time zone: UTC+3 (MSK)
- OKTMO ID: 24620000
- Website: https://privadmin.ru

Privolzhsky District (Russian: Приво́лжский райо́н) is an administrative and municipal district (raion), one of the twenty-one in Ivanovo Oblast, Russia. It is located in the north of the oblast. The area of the district is 600 square kilometers (230 sq mi). Its administrative center is the town of Privolzhsk. Population: 22,176 (2021 census); 26,327 (2010 census); 28,730 (2002 Census); 34,371 (1989 Soviet census). The population of Privolzhsk accounts for 64.6% of the district's total population.

== Administrative and municipal status ==
The town of Privolzhsk serves as the administrative center of the district. Prior to the adoption of the Law #145-OZ On the Administrative-Territorial Division of Ivanovo Oblast in December 2010, it was administratively incorporated separately from the district. Municipally, Privolzhsk is incorporated within Privolzhsky Municipal District as Privolzhskoye Urban Settlement.

The town of Plyos was also administratively incorporated separately from the district prior to the adoption of the Law #145-OZ. Municipally, Plyos is also incorporated within Privolzhsky Municipal District as Plyosskoye Urban Settlement.
