= Privolzhsk =

Town in Ivanovo Oblast, Russia

Privolzhsk Приволжск
- Town
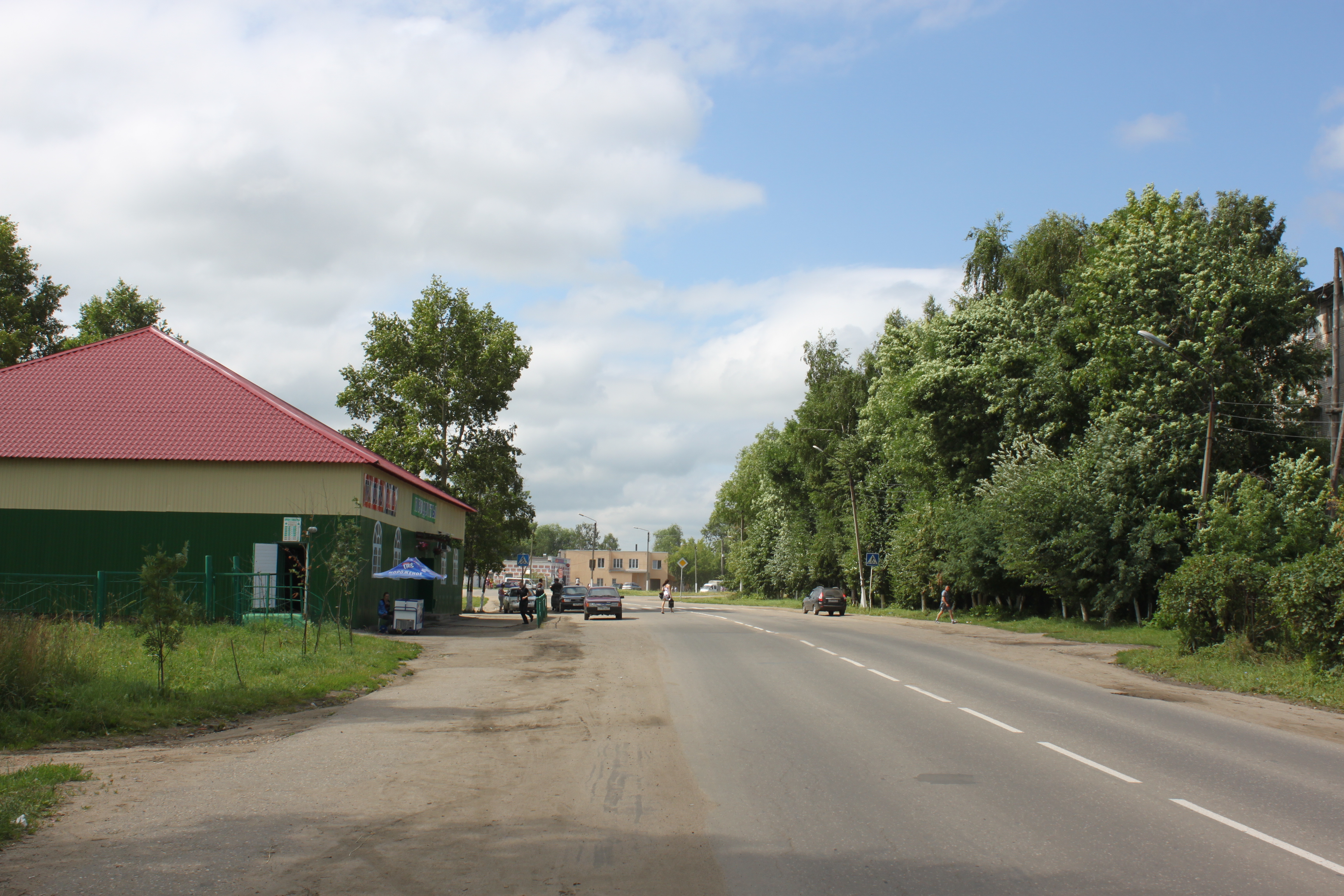
- Entrance to Privolzhsk

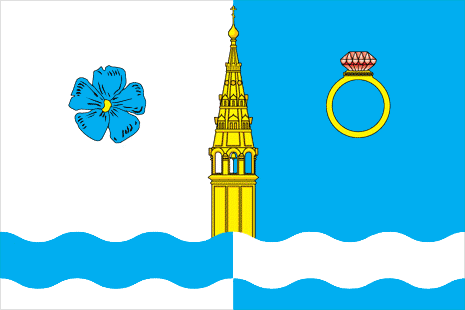
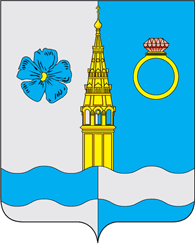
- Flag Coat of arms
- Interactive map of Privolzhsk
- Location of Privolzhsk Privolzhsk (Ivanovo Oblast)
- Coordinates: 57°22′57″N 41°17′10″E
- Country: Russia
- Federal subject: Ivanovo Oblast
- Administrative district: Privolzhsky District
- Known since: 1485
- Town status since: 1938
- Elevation: 110 m (360 ft)

Population (2010 Census)
  - Total: 16,747
  - Estimate (2021): 14,332 (−14.4%)

Administrative status
  - Capital of: Privolzhsky District

Municipal status
  - Municipal district: Privolzhsky Municipal District
  - Urban settlement: Privolzhskoye Urban Settlement
  - Capital of: Privolzhsky Municipal District, Privolzhskoye Urban Settlement
- Time zone: UTC+3 (MSK)
- Postal code: 155550
- Dialing code: +7 49339
- OKTMO ID: 24620106001

Privolzhsk (Russian: Приво́лжск) is a town and the administrative center of Privolzhsky District in Ivanovo Oblast, Russia, located on the Shacha River (right tributary of the Volga) 51 kilometers (32 mi) northeast of Ivanovo, the administrative center of the oblast. Population: 14,332 (2021 census); 16,747 (2010 census); 18,385 (2002 census); 20,680 (1989 Soviet census).

== History ==
It has been known since 1485 as the village of Yakovlevskoye Bolshoye (Я́ковлевское Большо́е). The town of Privolzhsk was formed by merging the village of Yakovlevskoye and the neighboring settlements in 1938.

== Administrative and municipal status ==
Within the framework of administrative divisions, Privolzhsk serves as the administrative center of Privolzhsky District, to which it is directly subordinated. Prior to the adoption of the Law #145-OZ On the Administrative-Territorial Division of Ivanovo Oblast in December 2010, it used to be incorporated separately as an administrative unit with the status equal to that of the districts.

As a municipal division, the town of Privolzhsk is incorporated within Privolzhsky Municipal District as Privolzhskoye Urban Settlement.

== Notable residents ==
- Oleg Borisov (1929–1994), actor
