= 1922 unrest in Shuya =

Riots in Shuya, Soviet Russia

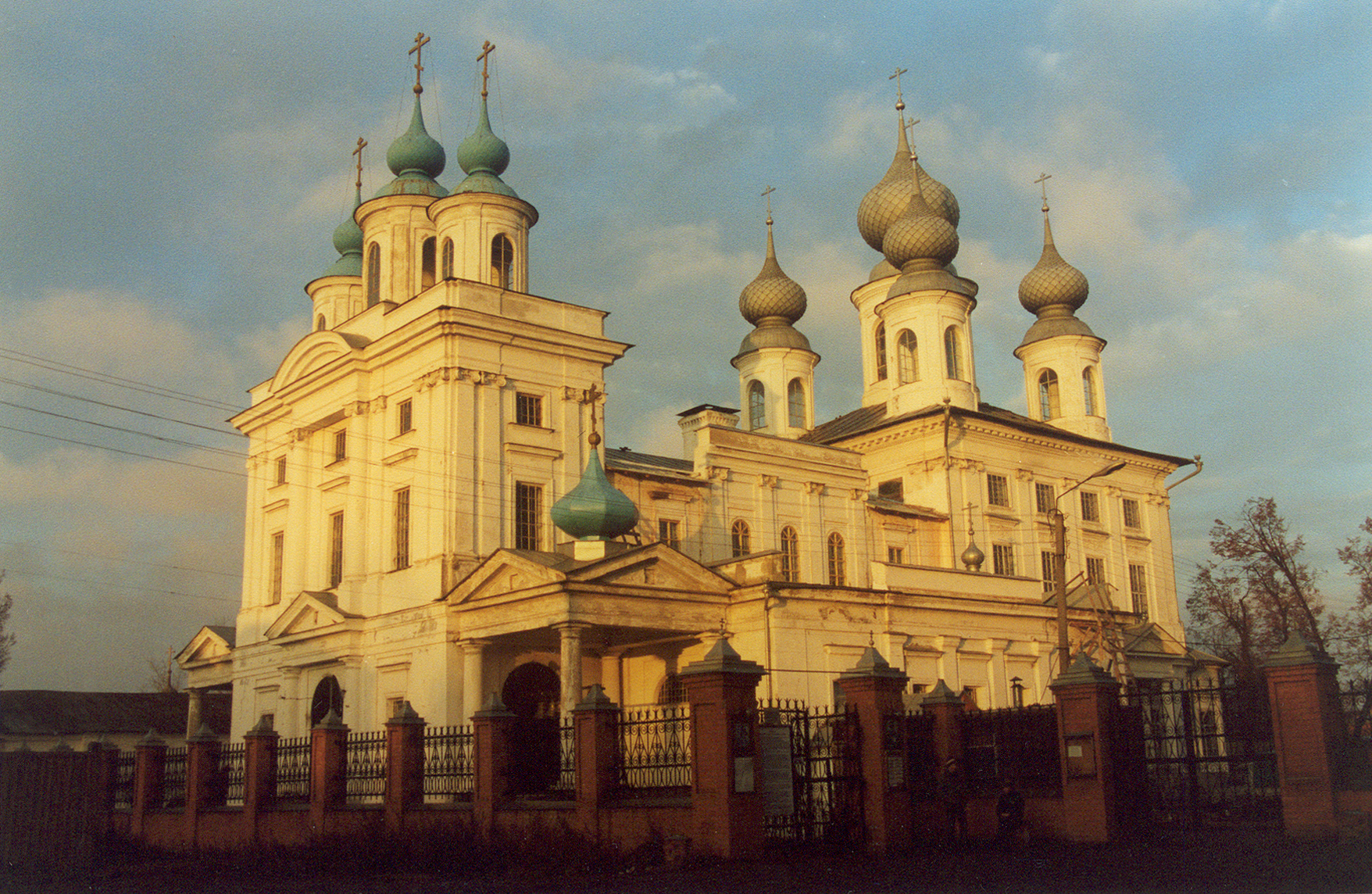
Shuya Cathedral

The unrest in Shuya refers to riots that took place on 15 March 1922 in the city of Shuya in Soviet Russia in connection with the confiscation of valuables belonging to Orthodox churches, ordered by the Council of People's Commissars. The official purpose of the process was to sell the items and use the proceeds to combat famine in the Volga region. Shuya was the first city where Orthodox resistance to the confiscation of local church furnishings was met with violence by the Bolshevik militia. As a result of shots fired into the crowd gathered in front of the Shuya Cathedral, 4 or 5 people were killed, according to various sources, and a dozen or so were wounded. Three more people – priests Ivan Rozhdestvensky and Pavel Svetozarov, and layman Pyotr Yazykov – were accused of counter-revolutionary activities and sentenced to death after a show trial.

== Background ==
Atheism, based on the arguments of Karl Marx, was one of the integral elements of communist ideology, on which the program of the Communist Party of the Soviet Union (Bolsheviks) was based. Consequently, from the moment they seized power in Russia after the October Revolution, the Bolsheviks took actions to undermine the position of the Russian Orthodox Church and, in the long term, to bring about its complete elimination. Measures to weaken the economic position of the church – such as confiscation of property acquired before the revolution and a ban on acquiring new real estate – were taken by their government in January and February 1919. There were also numerous cases of spontaneous looting of Orthodox churches and attacks on monasteries or priests by local party activists or soldiers of the newly formed Red Army. The government also undertook an organized campaign to open reliquaries. Despite his initial strong anti-Bolshevik stance, Patriarch Tikhon of Moscow forbade Orthodox clergy from engaging in political activity in a series of pastoral letters in 1919 and called on the faithful to refrain from seeking revenge for the wrongs they had suffered. In an official appeal, he also asked the people to obey the government in those actions that did not violate Christian ethics.

In February 1922, articles began to appear in the party press suggesting the possibility of using Orthodox Church valuables to help the starving inhabitants of the Volga region. At that time, Patriarch Tikhon again offered to voluntarily hand over unconsecrated items and an amount equal to the value of the remaining valuables. However, the Bolsheviks refused, deciding instead to confiscate them by force.

On the eve of the confiscation of Orthodox Church valuables, Shuya was an industrial town whose inhabitants mainly worked in the textile industry. Some of the workers took part in strikes during the Russian Revolution of 1905. At the same time, the city was an important center of Orthodox worship. The Shuya-Smolensk Hodegetria Icon of the Mother of God was kept in the Shuya Cathedral, and 9 Orthodox churches were operating in the city. Despite this, the commission appointed by the Bolsheviks to coordinate the confiscation did not anticipate any difficulties in carrying out its tasks in Shuya. Immediately after the announcement of the confiscation of church valuables, the Bolsheviks' intentions were discussed at parish council meetings in the city. On 12 March, it was finally decided to immediately start collecting voluntary monetary donations that could cover the value of the church furnishings and thus persuade the Bolsheviks to leave them in the churches.

== Riots in Shuya ==
=== Events of 13 March 1922 ===
N. Krivova writes that the first meeting between the faithful and the confiscation commission took place on 13 March. According to her description, those gathered at the cathedral were agitated and greeted the members of the commission with hostile shouts. These intensified when they entered the altar area. The chairman of the commission, A. Vitsin, asked Father Svetozarov to remove the agitated crowd from the church, but the priest refused, claiming that he had no right to expel anyone from the temple. After Vitsin's insistence, Svetozarov addressed the faithful, but they announced that they would not leave the cathedral until the Bolsheviks left. The commission ultimately left the building together with representatives of the parishioners, with whom it was to determine the fate of the church's valuable furnishings. Father Svetozarov then performed a moleben before the Shuya-Smolensk Icon of the Mother of God. The crowd gathered outside the cathedral continued to grow. Meanwhile, negotiations were ongoing between the delegates of the faithful and the commission. Its members announced that the parish council could be held accountable for gathering the faithful in defense of the church, contrary to state decrees, and that the confiscation would ultimately take place on 15 March. The delegates of the faithful returned to the crowd gathered in front of the cathedral and informed them of the outcome of the conversation. Those present spontaneously decided to remain in the square overnight, fearing that the church would be looted immediately after their departure.

14 March was a market day in Shuya. Many participants in the previous day's gathering at the cathedral urged people who had come from outside the city for the market to also come to the church the next day. Meanwhile, the Bolshevik authorities handed over virtually all control of the city to the chief of the militia and the local Red Army garrison. Illegal gatherings were temporarily banned and anyone considered to be "disturbing the peace" could be immediately arrested and brought before a revolutionary court.

=== 15 March 1922 ===
On the announced day of confiscation, crowds of believers began gathering at the Shuya Cathedral from the early hours of the morning. Female workers were particularly numerous, although men employed in textile factories also joined the protest, and two factories stopped work. According to eyewitness accounts, the faithful were better organized than two days earlier.

The square was entered by the militia commander, Bashenkov, accompanied by a mounted militia unit. The crowd responded to attempts to disperse them by throwing sticks and stones at the militiamen. Children were also among those gathered. Tomasz Terlikowski, quoting a collection of lives of New Martyrs and Russian believers compiled by hieromonk Damaskin Orlovsky, claims that the militiamen attacked the gathered women with lashes. Then some of them began to shout that they were ready to "die for the Mother of God". About 50 people left the square in front of the cathedral and attacked the local Commissariat of Military Affairs. 14 Red Army soldiers joined the militiamen, but they also had to retreat under the pressure of the crowd. In this situation, the commander of the garrison in Shuya, Tyulenev, sent a larger group of soldiers to the cathedral. However, the crowd rushed at them and managed to disarm some of them. Shots were fired from the rifles that had been seized as the soldiers fled. At the same time, the faithful also rang the bell in the cathedral bell tower. Its sound alerted more residents of the city, and the crowd in the square grew even larger.

Faced with the defeat of the forces sent to the church so far, Tyulenev dispatched two trucks with machine guns to the square. They fired volleys aimed above the gathered crowd. According to Krivova, the participants of the gathering then moved towards the vehicles. At that moment, more shots were fired into the dense crowd, killing four people and wounding 11. According to Tomasz Terlikowski, the shots were fired at the crowd when one of the men, Nikolai Malkov, shouted, "Orthodox Christians, fight for your faith!", after which Malkov was immediately shot.

After the shooting outside the cathedral, the crowd dispersed. The authorities immediately began arresting those suspected of participating in the riots. The announced confiscation was also carried out, and 3.5 poods of silver items were removed from the Shuya Cathedral. 11 wounded defenders of the church and 27 soldiers or militiamen, three of whom were severely beaten, were taken to hospitals.

==== Victims of the riots ====
According to the description of events in Shuya, subsequently adopted by the Council of Bishops of the Russian Orthodox Church as the official biography of the New Martyrs of Shuya canonized in 2000, the personal details of four people killed outside the cathedral on 15 March 1922 are known: Nikolai Malkov, Avksentiy Kalashnikov, Sergei Mefodiev, and a young girl named Anastasia.

=== Official version of events ===
According to a report by I. Korotkov, secretary of the gubernia committee in Ivanovo-Voznesensk, written two days after the riots, the residents of Shuya were incited to protest against the confiscation of valuable cathedral furnishings in the city by local Socialist Revolutionaries and Orthodox priests with monarchist views. The inhabitants of Shuya were to gather at the Shuya Cathedral and disarm some of the Red Army soldiers and militiamen on their way to the church. In response, the soldiers fired at the crowd with long guns and machine guns, killing five people and wounding another 15. One Red Army soldier was also killed. Korotkov's report also mentions a protest by employees from two factories in Shuya, who stopped work for one day. The author of the text claims that order was restored in the city on the evening of 15 March. He also reports on the establishment of a commission to investigate the incidents by the gubernia executive committee.

Korotkov included a different version of events in another telegram sent to the Central Committee of the Bolshevik Party. He omitted any mention of fatalities, stating only that four soldiers and 11 participants in the gathering had been injured as a result of the riots. Korotkov's statements were subsequently verified by a special commission composed of representatives of the state authorities and a representative of the Joint State Political Directorate, Y. Shtammer. According to its findings, approximately 5,000–6,000 residents of Shuya (out of a total population of 23,000) gathered at the cathedral. Six people were killed and eight wounded as a result of shots fired by Red Army soldiers.

Commenting on the events in Shuya immediately after they took place, the authorities wanted to minimize their significance and portray them as the result of manipulation of the population by priests or fanaticism on the part of women. Their participation in the riots was particularly emphasized, while the presence of male workers was concealed. In Bolshevik propaganda, the entire event was also portrayed as inspired by the Black Hundreds. However, investigations by a government-appointed commission showed that only one participant in the riots had any connection with this organization. The official version of the events in Shuya was widely propagated during meetings for workers and peasants.

== Reaction to the events ==
=== Trial of the riot participants ===
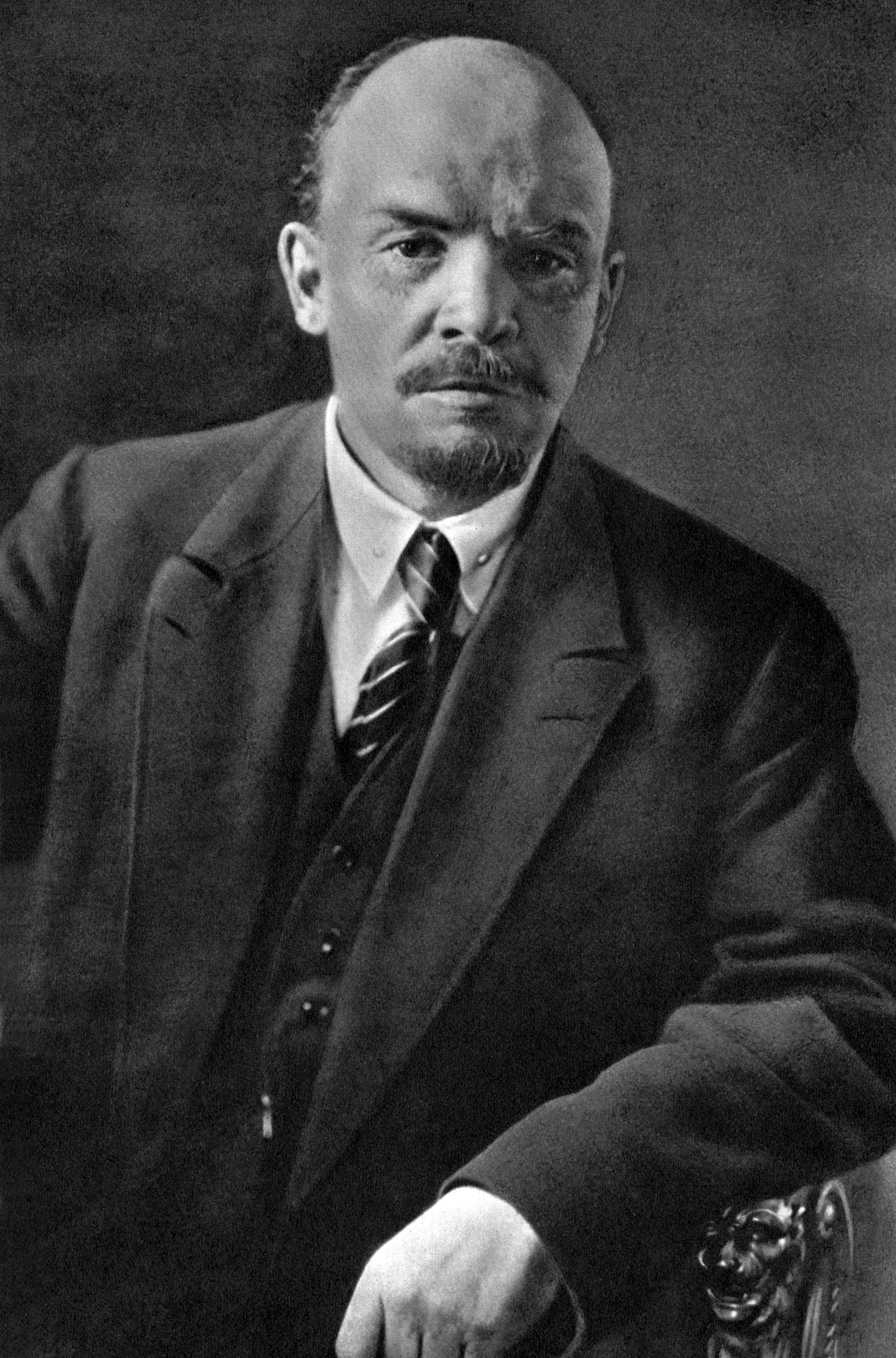
Vladimir Lenin was one of the driving forces behind the show trial of the participants in the Shuya unrest

The commission appointed in Shuya to investigate the circumstances of the events examined not only their exact course, but also the class origins of those involved. The investigation revealed that most of those gathered at the cathedral were workers, including several former members of the Bolshevik Party, which was not made public. Despite the disclosure of only part of the information about the events on a larger scale, the commission concluded that the use of force against unarmed civilians was also poorly received by many lower-ranking communist activists. Meanwhile, the city authorities decided to respond to the discontent with further repression. Immediate actions were taken to bring the participants of the riots before a revolutionary court. By 23 March 1922, 26 of them had been arrested.

As early as 18 March 1922, the Political Bureau of the Central Committee of the Bolshevik Party took up the matter of the riots in Shuya. After reviewing the materials of the commission investigating the events, the Politburo ordered an end to the confiscation of valuables in the Shuya Cathedral. This was carried out by an unusually large force, with the square in front of the church and the adjacent streets being cleared of people by force. The operation was commanded by N. Murayov. The next day, before the Politburo meeting, Vladimir Lenin personally demanded in a note that the trial of the "Shuya rebels" be conducted as quickly as possible and that the maximum number of death sentences be handed down.

A show trial of participants in the riots, accused of counter-revolutionary activities, took place in Ivanovo-Voznesensk from 21 to 25 April 1922. Prosecutor Smirnov demanded the death penalty for priests Pavel Svetozarov and Ivan Rozhdestvensky, as well as laymen Pyotr Yazykov and Vasily Pokhlebkin. Ultimately, the latter was sentenced to only 15 years in prison. The following sentences were handed down in the cases of the other defendants:

- Priests Alexander Smelchakov and Ivan Lavrov, as well as layman Sergei Korovin – two years' imprisonment, suspended (the defendants were deemed to have shown remorse),
- Alexander Paramonov – one year's imprisonment,
- Yefim Sharonov and Ivan Gureyev – two years' imprisonment,
- Mikhail Medvedev, Alexander Gorshkov, Alexei Trusov, Konstantin Bugrov, Vasily Afanasyev, Alexander Korzenev – three years' imprisonment,
- Khariton Borisov, Ivan Kryukov, and Olga Stolbunova – five years' imprisonment.

The death sentences were confirmed by the Politburo and carried out on 10 May 1922. The bodies of the victims were buried at the site of the execution and were not found until 2002.

== Bibliography ==
- Pipes, Richard (2005). Rosja bolszewików [Russia under the Bolshevik Regime] (in Polish). Translated by Jeżewski, W. Warsaw: Magnum. ISBN 83-89656-15-9. OCLC 69466391.
- Ilyin, Y. A. (2008). "Mart 1922 g.: tserkov, vlast, obshchestvo (svetskii vzgliad na sobytiia 13–15 marta v g. Shue Ivanovo-Voznesenskoi gubernii)" Март 1922 г.: церковь, власть, общество (светский взгляд на события 13—15 марта в г. Шуе Иваново-Вознесенской губернии) [March 1922: The Church, the Authorities, Society (A Secular View of the Events of 13–15 March in the City of Shuya, Ivanovo-Voznesensk Governorate] (PDF). Bulletin of Ivanovo State University (in Russian). 3.
