= Luchin =

Luchin may refer to:

- Luchyn, also known as Luchin, an agrotown in the Rahachow district, Gomel region, Belarus.
- Srdjan Luchin, a Romanian football player.
