= Valentin Drozd =

Belarusian Soviet Navy vice admiral

Valentin Petrovich Drozd
- Born: 16 September 1906; Buda-Kashalyova, Mogilev Governorate, Russian Empire
- Died: 29 January 1943 (aged 36) between Kronstadt and Leningrad, Soviet Union
- Buried: Communist Cemetery, Alexander Nevsky Lavra
- Allegiance: Soviet Union
- Branch: Soviet Navy
- Service years: 1925–1943
- Rank: Vice admiral
- Commands: Soviet destroyer Volodarsky; Baltic Fleet Destroyer Brigade; Northern Fleet; Baltic Fleet Light Forces Detachment; Baltic Fleet Squadron
- Conflicts: Spanish Civil War; World War II
- Awards: Order of Lenin; Order of the Red Banner (2)

Valentin Petrovich Drozd (Russian: Валентин Петрович Дрозд; 16 September [O.S. 3 September] 1906 – 29 January 1943) was a Belarusian Soviet Navy vice admiral killed in World War II.

Drozd served in the Soviet Navy from the mid-1920s, commanding the destroyer Volodarsky during the 1930s. After serving as an advisor to the Spanish Republican Navy during the Spanish Civil War, Drozd commanded the Baltic Fleet Destroyer Brigade and then the Northern Fleet during the late 1930s. He commanded the Baltic Fleet Light Forces Detachment from early 1941 and following the beginning of Operation Barbarossa led it during the August Evacuation of Tallinn. Rewarded for his performance with a promotion to vice admiral and the command of the Baltic Fleet Squadron in September, Drozd led the latter during the evacuation of Hanko Naval Base and the Siege of Leningrad. He was killed in late January 1943 when his car fell through ice after an artillery shell exploded near it.

== Early life and prewar career ==
Drozd was born on 16 September 1906 in Buda-Koshelevskaya, Mogilev Governorate and entered the Soviet Navy (then the Naval Forces of the Red Army) in 1925 as a student at the M.V. Frunze Naval School from November of that year. Upon his graduation in October 1928, Drozd served as an assistant watch officer aboard the battleship Oktyabrskaya Revolutsiya until April 1929, when he began studies at the Naval Pilots' School in Sevastopol, graduating by the end of the year. During 1930 he served as navigator of the destroyer Volodarsky and became a member of the Communist Party of the Soviet Union, and between October and May 1931 he studied at the torpedo class of the Specialized Courses for Commanders of the Naval Forces of the Red Army. After serving as a torpedo officer aboard the destroyer Stalin from graduation to January 1933, he became commander of the Volodarsky before becoming senior assistant commander of the battleship Marat in March 1935.

In October 1936 Drozd was sent to Spain as an adviser to the commander of the Spanish Republican Navy destroyer flotilla during the Spanish Civil War. For his actions during his one-year tour in Spain he received the Order of Lenin and the Order of the Red Banner. After returning to the Soviet Union he became commander of the Baltic Fleet Destroyer Brigade in November 1937, serving in that position until May 1938, when he became acting commander of the Northern Fleet on 28 May. He was made permanent commander of the fleet on 30 April 1939 after receiving the rank of Flagman 2nd rank on 9 April, and led it during the Winter War and until 26 July 1940; Drozd was made a counter admiral when the Soviet Navy changed its rank system on 4 June of that year. After becoming head of the Black Sea Higher Naval Institute in September 1940, Drozd served as commander of the Baltic Fleet Light Forces Detachment from February 1941.

== World War II ==
After Operation Barbarossa, the German invasion of the Soviet Union, began on 22 June 1941, Drozd led the detachment on minelaying operations in the Irbe Strait and the Gulf of Finland. He supervised the movement of the cruiser Kirov from the Gulf of Riga to Tallinn, and led the detachment in the defense of the main naval base at the latter port, and its evacuation to Kronstadt. Noted for his "brave leadership" in these operations by the Central Committee of the Communist Party of the Soviet Union, Drozd was promoted to vice admiral on 16 September and given commander of the Baltic Fleet Squadron. In this position he supervised the October evacuation of Hanko Naval Base and led the squadron in the defense of Leningrad. Awarded his second Order of the Red Banner in 1942, Drozd inspected the repairs of the ships of the squadron and the combat training of its personnel. He was killed on 29 January 1943 when his car fell through the ice between Kronstadt and Leningrad in the Gulf of Finland after a German shell broke the ice. He was buried in the Communist Cemetery of the Alexander Nevsky Lavra in Leningrad.

== Legacy ==
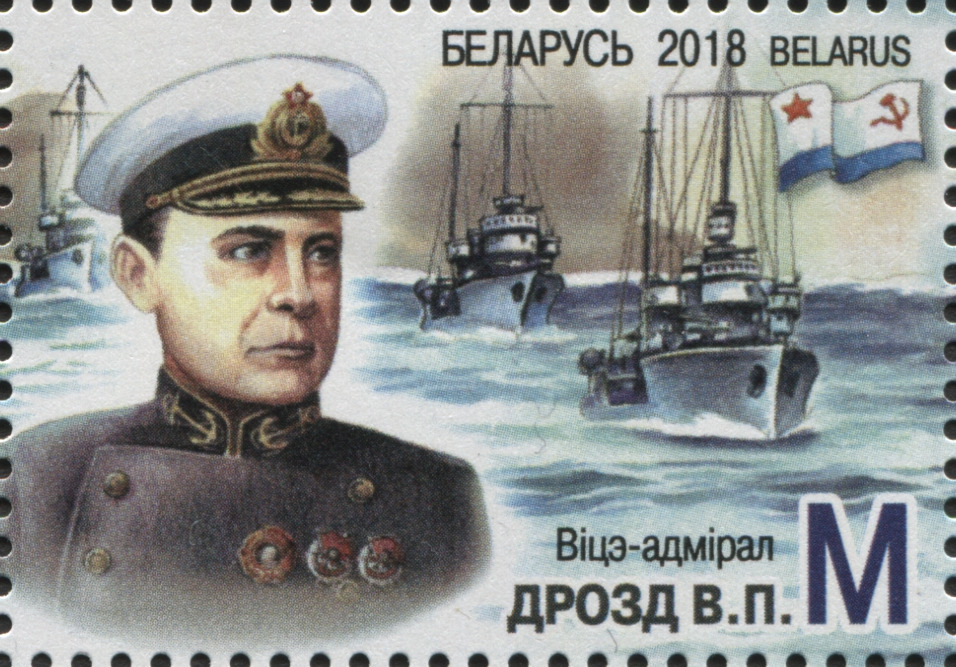
2018 postage stamp of Belarus depicting Drozd

The Storozhevoy-class destroyer Stoyky was renamed Vitse-Admiral Drozd in honor of Drozd on 13 February 1943, and his name was later used for a Kresta I-class cruiser. A monument to him was erected in Buda-Kashalyova, where a street is named in his honor. Drozd was depicted on a 2018 postage stamp issued by Belarus.
