= Yuri Rall =

Soviet naval officer (1890-1948)

Yuri Fedorovich Rall
- Born: 10 April [O.S. 29 March] 1890; Ufa, Ufa Governorate, Russian Empire
- Died: 16 September 1948 (aged 58) Leningrad, Soviet Union
- Buried: Kazachye Cemetery
- Allegiance: Russian Empire; Soviet Union
- Branch: Imperial Russian Navy; Soviet Navy
- Service years: 1912-1948
- Rank: Vice-Admiral
- Awards: Russian Empire: Order of Saint Stanislaus Second and Third Classes; Order of Saint Anna Third and Fourth Classes; Soviet Union: Order of Lenin; Order of the Red Banner (four times); Order of Nakhimov First Class; Order of Ushakov Second Class; Order of the Patriotic War First Class

Yuri Fedorovich Rall (Russian: Юрий Федорович Ралль) (10 April [O.S. 29 March] 1890 – 16 September 1948) was an officer of the Imperial Russian and Soviet Navies. He saw action during the First and Second World Wars, and rose to the rank of vice-admiral.

Rall began his service with the Imperial Navy, undertaking training and instruction at the Kronstadt Naval Engineering School and the Naval Cadet Corps, with practical experience as a midshipman in the Black Sea Fleet. He served in the Baltic Fleet during the First World War, graduating to his own commands towards the end of the war. A popular officer for his attention to the lower ranks, he supported the Bolsheviks after the Russian Revolution, and was elected to one of the ship committees. During the Russian Civil War he fought against the White Finns and British interventionist forces. As an experienced officer he was tasked with several staff positions after the war, and took a leading role in re-establishing the fleet's strength in the early Soviet period. He took a particular interest in training new officers, and took several roles in the naval academies.

After the German invasion of the Soviet Union in 1941, Rall was given important tasks in the defence and evacuation of Soviet forces. He commanded the rearguard during the Soviet evacuation of Tallinn, during which the evacuation convoys suffered heavy losses due to mines. Rall's flagship was sunk and he suffered severe injuries. After a month recovering in hospital, he was well enough to resume command, and helped to direct the naval defences during the siege of Leningrad, and subsequent offensive operations as the Germans were pushed back. Receiving several awards for his service, Rall returned to academic life after the war, and wrote a number of military and historical texts before his death in 1948.

== Early life ==
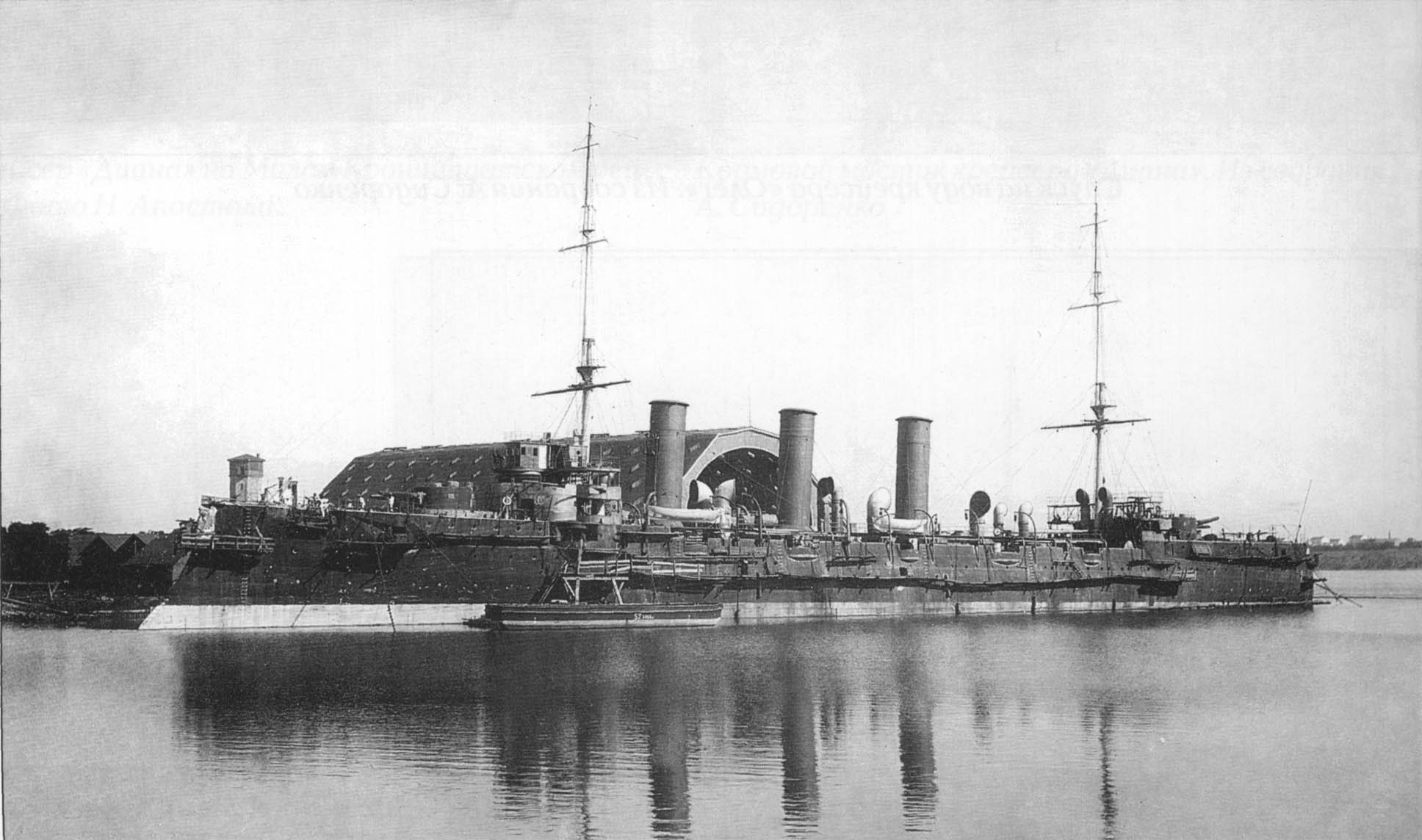
The cruiser Kagul. Rall served aboard her as a midshipman in the Black Sea Fleet.

Rall was born on 10 April [O.S. 29 March] 1890 in the city of Ufa, Ufa Governorate, in the Russian Empire. His family later moved to Moscow, and Rall entered school there at the age of 10. After completing school in 1908, he joined the Kronstadt Naval Engineering School and then entered the Naval Cadet Corps, graduating in 1912. After service as a midshipman and officer of the watch aboard the cruiser Kagul in the Black Sea Fleet, he was promoted to officer rank in 1913 and went on to take the advanced navigation courses for officers, graduating in 1915.

== First World War and Civil War ==
From then he joined the Baltic Fleet, serving on the Rossia, Verniy and Rezviy, and temporarily commanding the destroyer Ryanny. Rall then took the wartime special course in minesweeping in 1917. He commanded the destroyer Podvizhniy between 1917 and 1918, and in 1918 took command of the transport vessel Riga. As an officer he was noted for "always defending the honor and dignity of the subordinate sailors." He supported the Bolsheviks during the Russian Civil War, and as commander of the Podvizhniy was elected one of the first chairmen of the ship committees in Revel. He went on to command the destroyer Kapitan Izylmetyev between 1918 and 1919. In 1919 Rall was appointed flag navigator in command of minesweeping and barrages, and chief of the Baltic Sea mine defences. He took part in operations against the White Finns on Lake Ladoga and British interventionist forces in the Baltic.

== Rebuilding the fleet ==
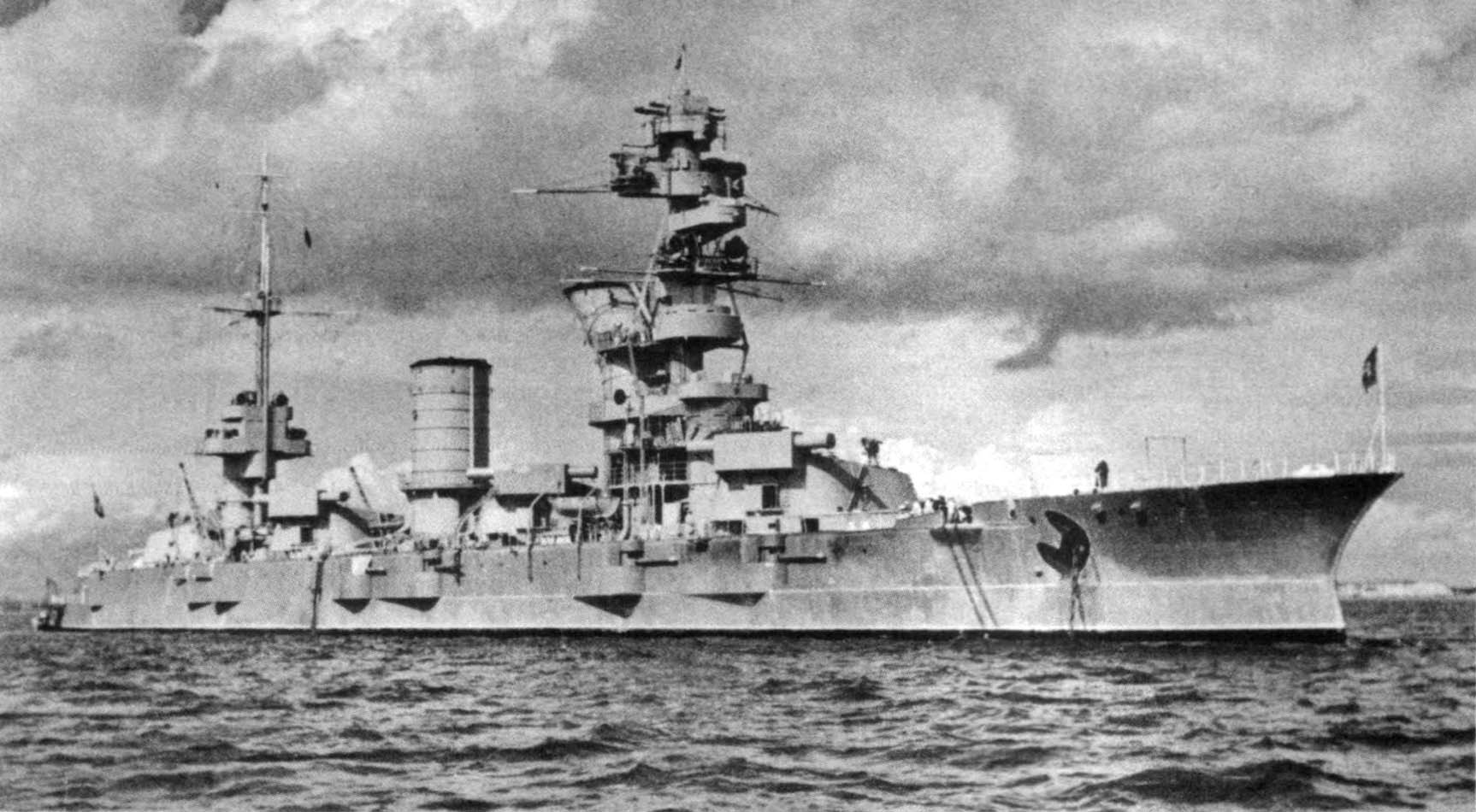
The battleship Marat, Rall's command from 1923 to 1926.

In 1921 he was appointed Chief of Operations of the Baltic Fleet Headquarters, and from 1921 to 1922 served as chief navigator of the Main Navigation Directorate's minesweeping department. From 1922 to 1923 he was flag navigator at the fleet headquarters, and from 1923 to 1926 commanded the battleship Marat. The fleet had suffered from neglect during the Civil War, and few were operational. Rall was approached by Pavel Dybenko and was informed that Lenin had recommended restoring the fleet's warships. Rall oversaw the repairs of a number of ships in his capacity as senior naval commander at Kronstadt, and the Marat was joined by the battleship Oktyabrskaya Revolutsiya, the cruiser Aurora, the training ship Komsomolets and several other reconditioned ships. Rall then took the squadron on a five thousand mile voyage from Kronstadt to Arkhangelsk, via Bergen and Murmansk, then returning to Kronstadt, demonstrating Soviet intentions to rebuild its naval power.

In 1926 Rall took the higher academic courses at the Naval Academy, and from later that year served as the head of the M.V. Frunze Higher Naval School and as commander of the fleet's detachment of training ships. Nikolai Kuznetsov, later admiral of the fleet of the Soviet Union, recalled that "Yuri Fedorovich Rall, an old experienced sailor, taught me a lot. He often stood on the bridge next to me and, in the most difficult conditions of mooring or maneuvering, gave reasonable advice ... He taught me how best to follow the movement of my ship along coastal lights, how to moor in a pressing wind, what to look for in very narrow places or during storms ... He gave good instructions on how to bring up personnel. In my memory were the words of Yuri Fedorovich: "When passing a formation, never look past people. Remember that they all look at you. Try and look at each of them." In 1930 Rall was appointed Deputy Head of the Navy's Training and Border Directorate, and from 1932 commanded the Black Sea Fleet's cruiser brigade. In 1935 he took up a teaching position at the Naval Academy, and from 1936 to 1939 was a Head of Department at the V. I. Lenin Military-Political Academy. Rall then served as head of the Navy's Combat Training Directorate, and at the same time was deputy chairman of the Main statutory commission. In 1940 flag ranks were introduced in the Red Army and the Navy. On 4 August 1940 Rall was awarded the rank of rear admiral.

== Second World War ==
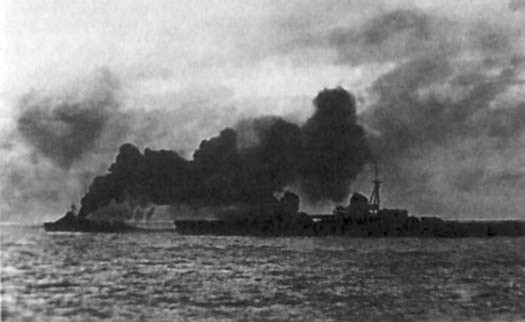
The Soviet evacuation of Tallinn in 1941. The cruiser Kirov manoeuvres under cover of a smoke screen.

During the German invasion of the Soviet Union in 1941, Rall was appointed commander of the Eastern defensive position on 25 June and oversaw the installation of shore batteries on the islands of Bolshoy Tyuters and Lavensaari, and the laying of minefields in the Gulf of Finland. He was then tasked with taking part in the complicated operation to evacuate the ships of the Baltic Fleet from besieged Tallinn and bring them to Kronstadt. Rall was given command of the rearguard. With three evacuation routes possible, Rall advised taking the southernmost one. Though this passed through shallow water and along 200 miles of occupied coastline with enemy shore batteries, Rall pointed out that the shore batteries mainly consisted of light field guns, which could easily be suppressed by Soviet naval artillery, and that 200 vessels had made the passage without difficulty. The advice was rejected by Marshal Kliment Voroshilov, commander of the Leningrad Front, who, concerned about the possibility of Latvian and Estonian crews, and even Soviet sailors, defecting to the enemy, ordered Rall and his superior Admiral Vladimir Tributs to take the middle route, despite it having been heavily mined by enemy forces. The evacuation convoys soon began to suffer heavy losses to mines and air attacks. Rall's flagship, the destroyer Kalinin, struck a mine and began to sink. The destroyer Volodarskiy came alongside to take off the crew, but also hit a mine and sank. Rall, injured and concussed, was taken aboard a cutter. He was eventually brought back to Kronstadt with the survivors of the evacuation force. While the Soviet leadership claimed a victory in evacuating a number of troops and refugees, Rall remarked that it had been a "Second Tsushima", referring to the heavy defeat at the Battle of Tsushima during the Russo-Japanese War.

Rall spent a month recovering in hospital, and in September was appointed chief of staff of the Baltic Fleet, a post he held until January 1943. By a resolution of the Council of People's Commissars he was promoted on 16 September 1941 promoted to vice admiral. Rall formed an operational group of staff officers and developed a plan for the evacuation of the Hanko Naval Base. In May 1942 he formed four naval artillery groups to support the troops of the Leningrad Front, and provided assistance to the Leningrad and Volkhov Fronts during the Sinyavino Offensive in August–September 1942. On 1 January 1943 Rall took command of a squadron of ships and carried out offensives from January 1943 to March 1944, and in March 1944 he was appointed commander of the Kronstadt naval defensive area. He took part in the establishment of a naval base at Luga Bay, and in the transport of troops from Oranienbaum to Lisy Nos. On 21–22 June 1944 he commanded the landing forces at the Beryozovye Islands, capturing the archipelago.

== Postwar service ==
From 1945 Rall worked in the commissions for the division of the German fleet, and was head of the department of tactics of surface ships and anti-mine defence of the Naval Academy. He authored over forty scientific and military-historical works, including Description of the Northern Sea Theatre (Russian: Описание Северного морского театра), Description of the Finnish-Ladoga Theatre (Russian: Описание Финско-ладожского театра), Guide for Navigation in the Finnish Skerries (Russian: Руководство для плавания в Финских шхерах), Night Minesweeping (Russian: Ночное траление), What Are Warships (Russian: Какие бывают военные корабли), Torpedo Boats (Russian: Торпедные катера), and Surface Mine-Laying (Russian: Надводные минные заградители). Rall died in Leningrad on 16 September 1948 and was buried in the Communist Square in the Alexander Nevsky Lavra. Over the course of his career he had received from the Tsarist government the Order of Saint Stanislaus Second and Third Classes and the Order of Saint Anna Third and Fourth Classes; and from the Soviet government the Order of Lenin, four Orders of the Red Banner, the Order of Nakhimov First Class, the Order of Ushakov Second Class, the Order of the Patriotic War, First Class, and numerous medals. Rall became the first recipient of the Order of Ushakov Second Class at its initial award on 22 July 1944.^{[a]} Rall's great-grandmother was Fyodor Ushakov's niece. Rall had married, and had a son, Vsevolod, and a daughter, Marina.

== Notes ==
a. Rall's superior in the Baltic Fleet, Admiral Vladimir Tributs, became the first recipient of Order of Ushakov First Class at the same time.
