= Pavel Vasilievich Chudinov =

Imperial Russian Army general (1865–1922)

- Павел Васильевич Чудинов
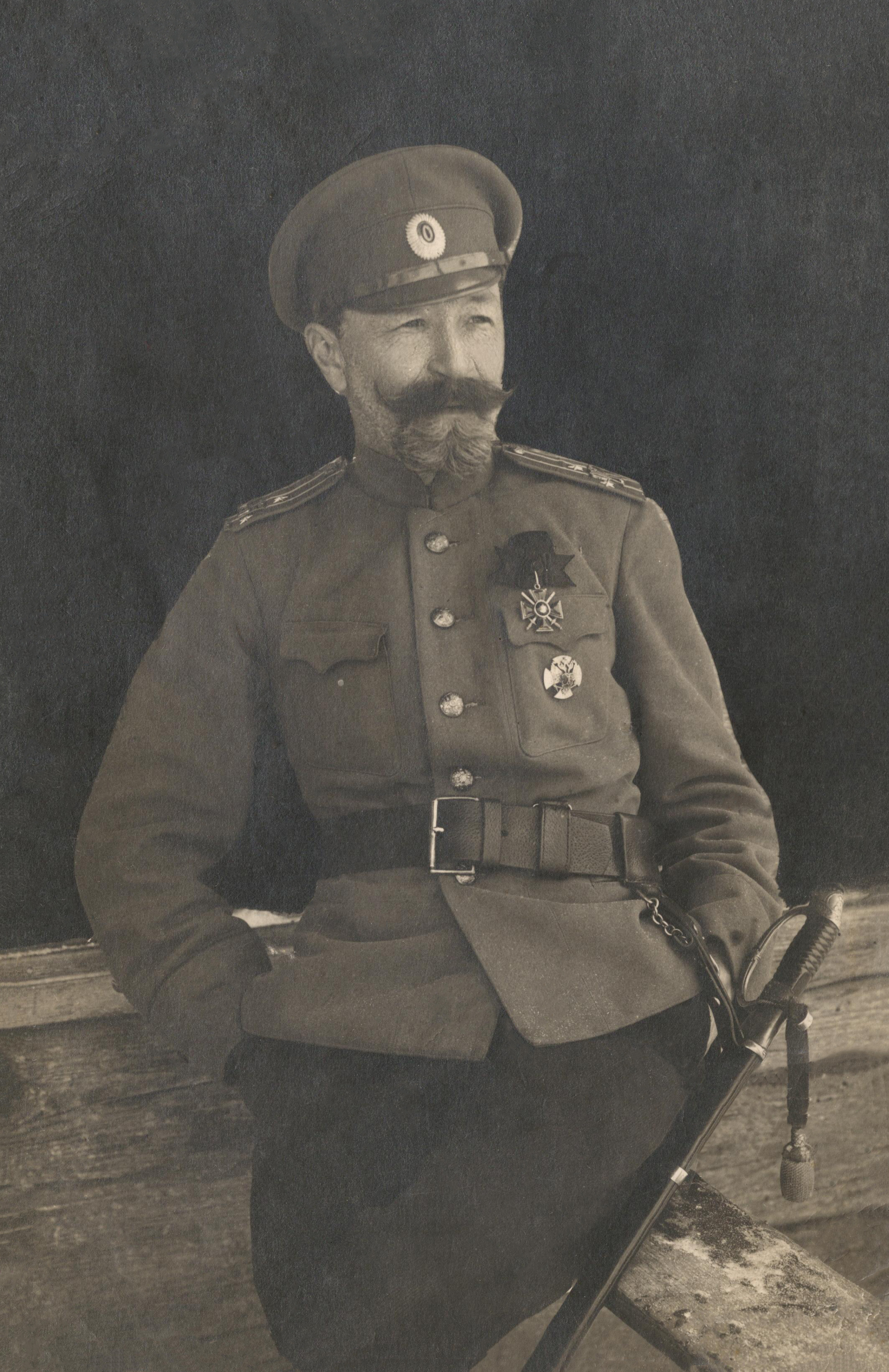
- Born: 6 December 1865
- Died: 19 September 1922 (aged 56)
- Military career
- Allegiance: Russian Empire; Russian SFSR
- Branch: Imperial Russian Army; Red Army
- Service years: 1886–1900; 1904–1917; 1918–1922
- Rank: Polkovnik
- Conflicts: Russo-Japanese War; World War I Russian Civil War

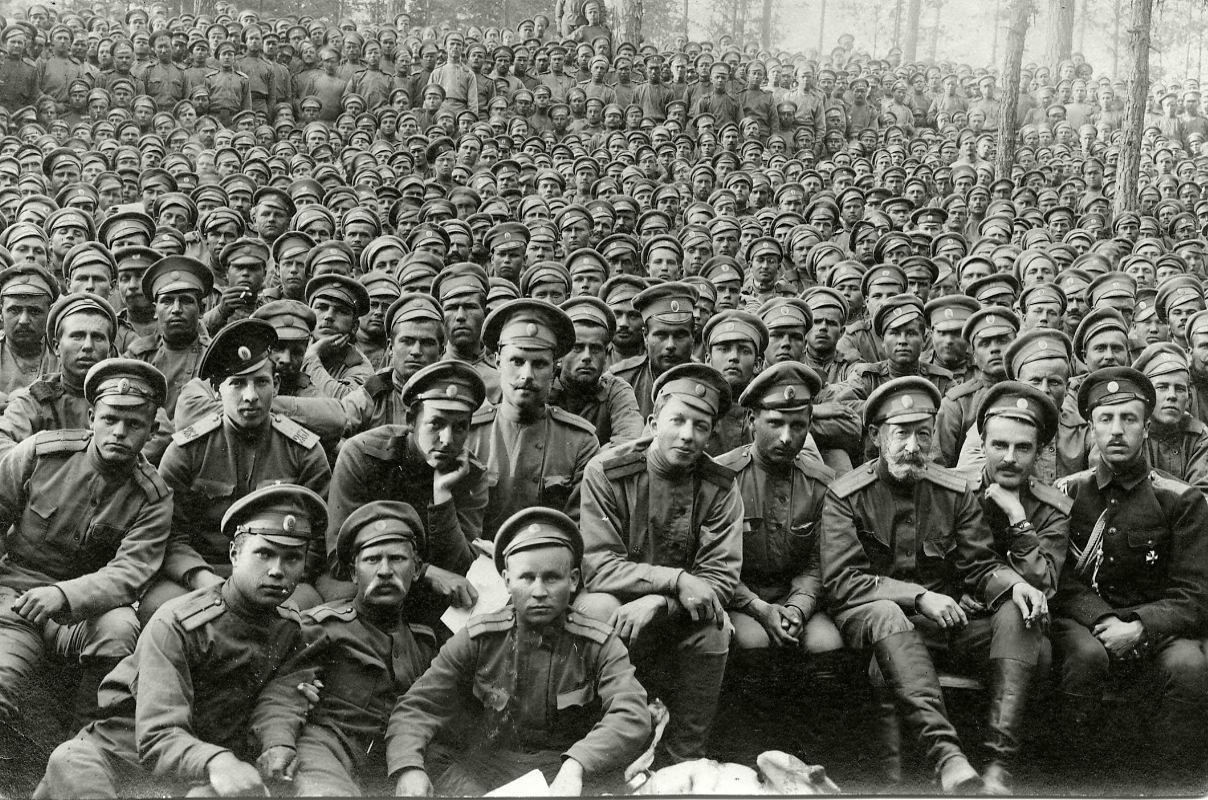
Chudinov 3rd from the right, 29 June 1916.

Pavel Vasilyevich Chudinov (Russian: Павел Васильевич Чудинов; 6 December 1865 – 19 September 1922) was an Imperial Russian Army officer who participated in the Russo-Japanese War, World War I, and Russian Civil War.

== Biography ==
Orthodox. From hereditary nobility. Educated in the Pskov Cadet Corps, where he completed 5 classes. He entered the service in 1886, enrolled in the lists of the 146th Tsaritsyn Infantry Regiment as a private with the rights of a volunteer. He completed a course in the regimental training team. In 1888 he was sent to the Saint Petersburg Infantry Cadet School, enrolled in the senior class and renamed a junker. In 1889, he graduated from the school with the 2nd category, ranked as a podpraporshchik. Upon arrival at the regiment, he was appointed acting quartermaster. He was in charge of the hunting team in 1893–1900. In 1899 he was sent to the Office of the Yamburg District Military Chief to train soldiers of the State Militia. Second lieutenant (senior since 6.04.1890), lieutenant (senior since 6.04.1894). In June 1900, he was enlisted in the army infantry reserve and excluded from the lists of the said regiment. He transferred to civil service in the Peasants' Land Bank, which was under the jurisdiction of the Ministry of Finance, and was appointed assistant controller of the 2nd category, and from March 1901, assistant controller of the 1st category.

== Russo-Japanese War ==
In June 1904, he was called up from the reserve for military service in the 87th Neishlot Infantry Regiment, which took part in the Russo-Japanese War as part of the active army. Staff captain (senior since 18.05.1904). He was wounded in battle on 3 October 1904 in the area of Yantai mines (battle for Novgorodskaya Sopka), and subsequently underwent treatment in hospital.

By the highest order of the Military Department of 17 July 1906, he was again called up from the reserve and enlisted in the 87th Infantry Neishlot Regiment. Captain (26 November 1909, seniority since 18 April 1906).

== World War I ==
With the outbreak of World War I, he was transferred to the 267th Dukhovshchinsky Infantry Regiment of the second line. For his distinction in battles against the enemy, he was awarded the rank of lieutenant colonel (from 15.11.1914). For his excellent and diligent service and labors during military operations, on 8 September 1916, he was awarded the Monarch's highest favour.

After the October Revolution, he briefly served in the line unit, and then in the economic unit of the Red Army of the Petrograd Military District until the day of his death. He died of a heart attack in September 1922; he was buried in the Cossack Cemetery of the Alexander Nevsky Lavra, opposite the Trinity Cathedral.

== Awards ==
- Order of St. Anne, 4th class (1904, awarded on July 10, 1905)
- Order of St. Anne, 3rd class (1909)
- Order of St. Stanislav, 2nd class (December 6, 1912)
- Order of St. Anne, 2nd class (1917)
- Order of St. Vladimir, 4th class with swords and bow (May 28, 1915)
- Order of the White Eagle (Serbia) with swords
- Medal "In Memory of the Reign of Emperor Alexander III"

== Family ==
He was married toSerafima Savvatyevna Rossikhina, (1872–1942), daughter of an Arkhangelsk tradesman. They had seven children: Pyotr (1898–1942), Anna (1900–1945), Varvara (1902–1992), Vasily (1903–1977), Sergei (1906–1983), Rufina (1908–1999), Regina (Rufina's twin sister; died in infancy).
