= Kazachye Cemetery =

Cemetery in Saint Petersburg, Russia

Coordinates: 59°55′15″N 30°23′15″E

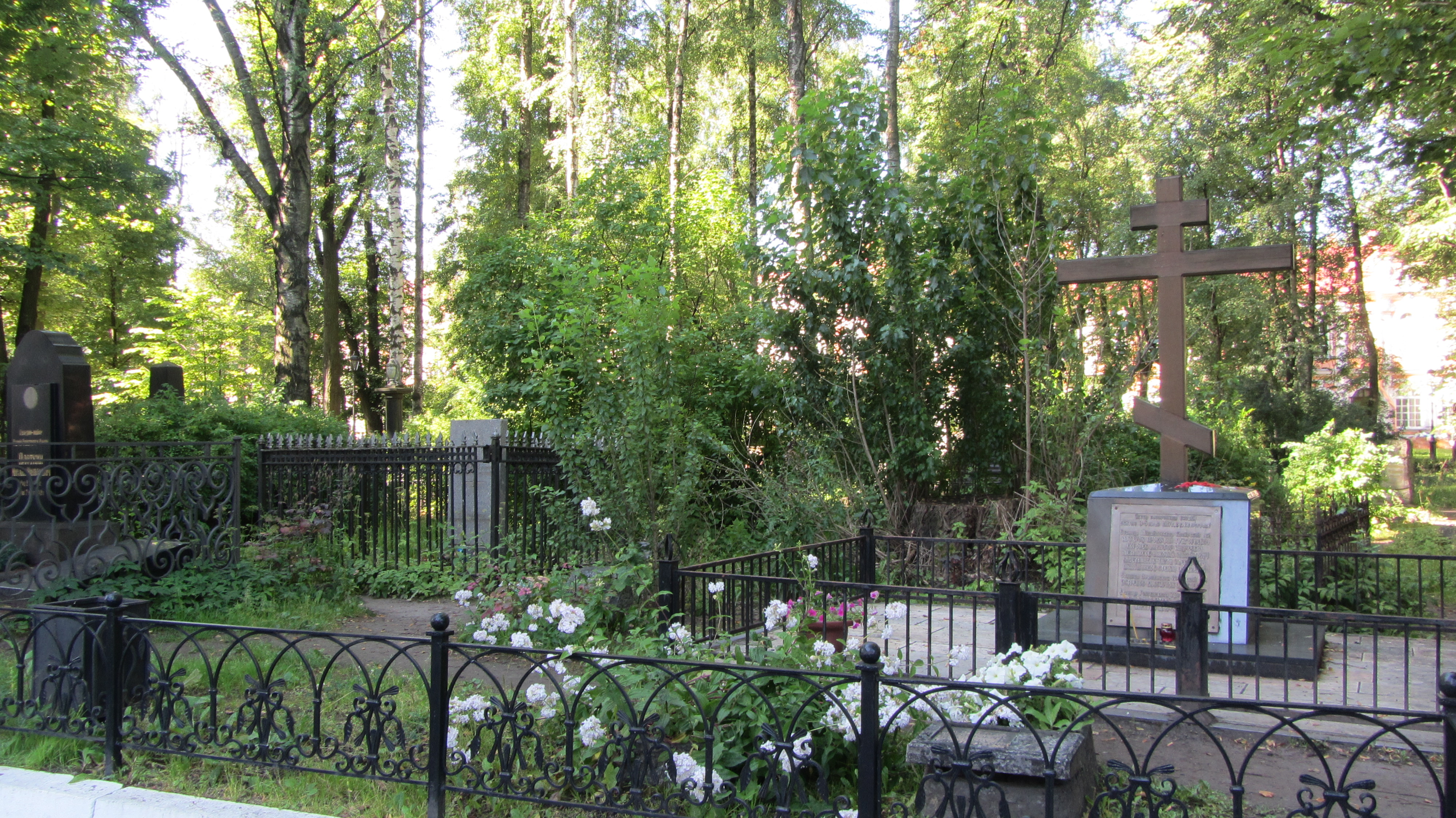
Monuments in the Kazachye Cemetery

Kazachye Cemetery (Russian: Казачье кладбище), formerly known as Communist Square (Russian: Коммунисти́ческая площа́дка) and also known as the Internal Cemetery of the Alexander Nevsky Lavra (Russian: Вну́треннее кла́дбище Алекса́ндро-Не́вской ла́вры) is a historic cemetery in the centre of Saint Petersburg. It is part of the Alexander Nevsky Lavra, and is one of four cemeteries in the complex.

Established during the Russian Revolution in 1917 as a burial ground for Cossacks killed during the July Days, it was soon used for the interment of several prominent communist activists, and was the site of mass graves of those who had died to defend communism in the Russian Civil War. In light of this, it became known as "Communist Square". The graves of several high profile military leaders and scientists were located here during the 1920s and 1930s, with further burials taking place during the siege of Leningrad. More interments took place in the postwar years, but the number eventually declined during the last years of the twentieth century, until the cemetery was closed. An estimated 700 people were buried here during the years of its operation, and in 2009 its original name, "Kazachye", was restored.

== Establishment ==
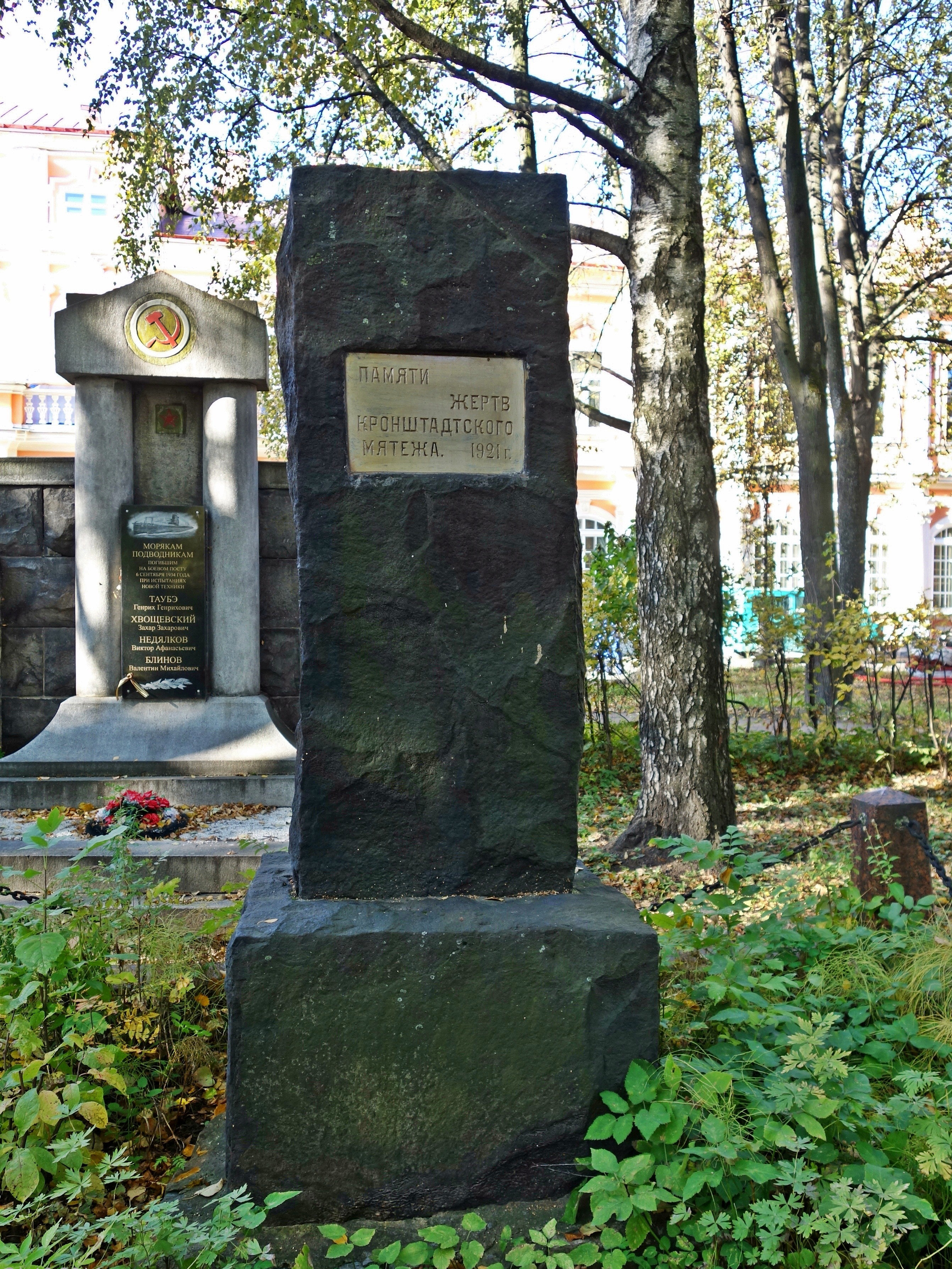
Monument marking the mass grave of some of those who died during the 1921 Kronstadt rebellion

The site now occupied by the cemetery was formerly a garden which separated the Cathedral of the Holy Trinity from the Metropolitan's house. The first burials took place in July 1917, the interments of Cossacks who had been killed while supporting the Russian Provisional Government during the dispersal of the Bolshevik demonstrators in the July Days. This gave the burial ground its name, Kazachye meaning Cossack. Over the next few years further burials took place, with the cemetery being officially inaugurated in December 1919. This became the fourth and final cemetery to be established in the monastery complex, after the Lazarevskoe in the 1710s, the Tikhvin in 1823, and the Nikolskoe in 1863. Early members of the Communist Party were among those interred, including the secretary of Petrokommuna S. M. Scriabin, and writer A. M. Dmitrevskaya, together with soldiers who had fought to defend Petrograd from Nikolai Yudenich's White forces in 1919. In 1921 some of those killed during the suppression of the Kronstadt rebellion were buried in a mass grave in the cemetery.

With the interments of those who had worked and fought for communism, the cemetery became a high-status burial ground for communists, second only to the Field of Mars. Renamed "Communist Square", revolutionaries, party workers, policemen, and security personnel were buried here, as well as prominent representatives of the Soviet intelligentsia such as Nicholas Marr, and Boris Legran, the director of the Hermitage Museum. It was a popular burial location for doctors – Ivan Grekov, Gleb Ivashentsov and Sergey Fedorov. Burials temporarily ceased after 1938, but resumed during the Second World War and the siege of Leningrad. Prominent leaders of the defence of Leningrad were buried here, including generals Avramiy Shmay-Kreitsberg, Beniamin Galstyan, and Ivan Nikolaev; admirals Valentin Drozd and Yuri Rall; and Heroes of the Soviet Union Nikolai Kozlov, Pyotr Andreevich Pilyutov and Mikhail Plotkin.

== Later years and closure ==
Burials at the cemetery continued until the 1970s. In the post-war period, Ivan Zubkov, the head of construction of the Leningrad Metro, was buried here. The last coffin burial, that of S. V. Andreiuk, took place in 1970. Burials of cremated remains continued for a time, with 28 interments of ashes up until the last, that of V. N. Kosenkov, in 2001. When the cemetery finally closed, it was calculated that it contained 449 graves in various states of preservation, and around 700 people had been buried there. The cemetery was transferred from the city administration back into the care of the monastery, and in 2005, the monument "The Triumph of Orthodoxy" was erected at the cemetery, in memory of all victims of the Orthodox faith. In 2009 its original name Kazachye was restored.

== Burials and monuments ==
Image	Name	Born	Died	Occupation	Monument	Reference
	Pavel Chudinov	1865	1922	Army officer, Russo-Japanese War, First World War.		
	Valentin Drozd	1906	1942	Naval officer, admiral, Spanish Civil War, Northern Fleet, Baltic Fleet, Second World War, Siege of Leningrad.		
	Sergey Fyodorov	1869	1936	Surgeon-urologist, professor of the Imperial Military Medical Academy, Imperial Court Surgeon, "the father of Russian urology".		
	Boris Legran	1884	1936	Revolutionary, Soviet consular official, director of the State Hermitage Museum.		
	Nicholas Marr	1865	1934	Historian and linguist, Japhetic theory.		
	Eino Rahja	1885	1936	Russian Social Democratic Labour Party and Bolshevik activist, Finnish Civil War, Red Army commander.		
	Yuri Rall	1890	1948	Naval officer, First and Second World Wars, Russian Civil War. Soviet evacuation of Tallinn, siege of Leningrad.		
	Vasily Shvetsov	1898	1958	Army officer, colonel general. Russian Civil War and Second World Wars, twice Order of Lenin.		
	Alexander Zelenoy	1872	1922	Naval officer, admiral, First World War, Baltic Fleet, Russian Civil War.		
	Pyotr Pilyutov	1906	1960	Pilot ace, Hero of the Soviet Union recipient, Winter War, World War II, Siege of Leningrad.		
