= Pyotr Andreevich Pilyutov =

Soviet fighter pilot and flying ace during the Second World War

- Петр Андреевич Пилютов; Пётр Андрэевіч Пілютаў
- Born: 23 December 1906; Luchin, Rogachev Uezd, Mogilev Governorate, Russian Empire
- Died: 24 March 1960 (aged 53); Leningrad, Soviet Union
- Burial place: Kazachye Cemetery, Saint Petersburg
- Military career
- Allegiance: Soviet Union
- Branch: Soviet Air Force
- Service years: 1928–1955
- Rank: Colonel
- Units: 154th Fighter Aviation Regiment; 13th Air Army; 29th Guards Fighter Aviation Regiment; 275th Fighter Aviation Division
- Conflicts: Battle of Lake Khasan; Winter War; Second Battle of Summa; Battle of Vyborg Bay; World War II; Eastern Front; Operation Barbarossa; Siege of Leningrad
- Awards: Order of the Red Star (2); Order of the Red Banner (4); Order of Lenin (4); Order of the Patriotic War; Hero of the Soviet Union; Order of the British Empire

Pyotr Andreevich Pilyutov (Russian: Петр Андреевич Пилютов, Belarusian: Пётр Андрэевіч Пілютаў; 23 December [O.S. 10 December] 1906 – 24 March 1960) was a Soviet fighter pilot and flying ace during the Winter War and World War II who totaled 14 solo and 1 shared aerial victories. Pilyutov is a recipient of the Hero of the Soviet Union award, taking part in the defense of Leningrad.

== Biography ==
Pilyutov was born to a peasant family on 23 December 1906 in the village of Luchin in the Rogachev Uezd of the Mogilev Governorate in the Russian Empire, now in the Rahachow district of the Gomel region of Belarus. Pilyutov did not complete high school, and moved to Asha, Ural Oblast (now Chelyabinsk Oblast) in 1924 to work in a metallurgical plant.

=== Military Service ===
Pilyutov was conscripted into the Red Army on 14 November 1928, from the city of Kuybyshev, Novosibirsk Oblast. Pilyutov graduated from the 1st Military School of Aviation Technicians named after K. E. Voroshilov in 1932 as an aviation technician, and from the Kacha Military School of Pilots in 1935 as a pilot.

In 1934, Pilyutov participated in the rescue of passengers on the SS Chelyuskin as a mechanic under famous pilot Nikolai Kamanin, where he was awarded the first Order of Lenin. In 1938, Pilyutov fought in the Battle of Lake Khasan against Manchukuo forces, and in the Winter War from 17 February 1940 to 13 March 1940 against the Finnish White Guard on the Karelian Isthmus during the Second Battle of Summa and the Battle of Vyborg Bay. In 1939, Pilyutov had officially joined the Communist Party of the Soviet Union as a full member.

Upon the invasion of the Soviet Union by Nazi Germany in June 1941 during World War II, Pilyutov fought in the front lines as the deputy commander of the 154th Fighter Aviation Regiment, part of the 275th Fighter Aviation Division in the later 13th Air Army, and during the Siege of Leningrad. During the fighting, Pilyutov earned an Order of the Red Banner on 22 August 1941, and an Order of Lenin on 3 December 1941. On 17 December 1941, during an escort mission to defend a group of nine Lisunov Li-2 transport aircraft from besieged Leningrad to Podborovye over Lake Ladoga, then-Captain Pilyutov intercepted 6 enemy aircraft (including one captured Polikarpov I-15) solo in his Curtiss P-40 Warhawk in an unequal air battle over the village of Sumskaya, lasting 15–20 minutes. During this battle, Pilyutov shot down 2 enemy aircraft allowing the transport fleet to escape. Pilyutov had received 25 recorded injuries to himself and damage to his plane's engine and fuselage.

On 10 February 1943, Pilyutov was awarded the Hero of the Soviet Union (#885) alongside another Order of Lenin. Promoted to lieutenant colonel, Pilyutov was appointed as commander of the 29th Guards Fighter Aviation Regiment on 28 May 1943. Pilyutov was awarded an honorary Order of the British Empire as an Officer on 19 January 1944.

By 9 May 1945, Pilyutov had made a total of 344 combat sorties, 74 air battles, and shot down 14 enemy aircraft solo and one in a group. Pilyutov's flight book claims a victory total of 17 enemy aircraft while solo, and 6 aircraft in a group. After Nazi Germany had surrendered, Pilyutov participated in the 1945 Moscow Victory Parade on 24 June 1945.

=== Post-war and Death ===
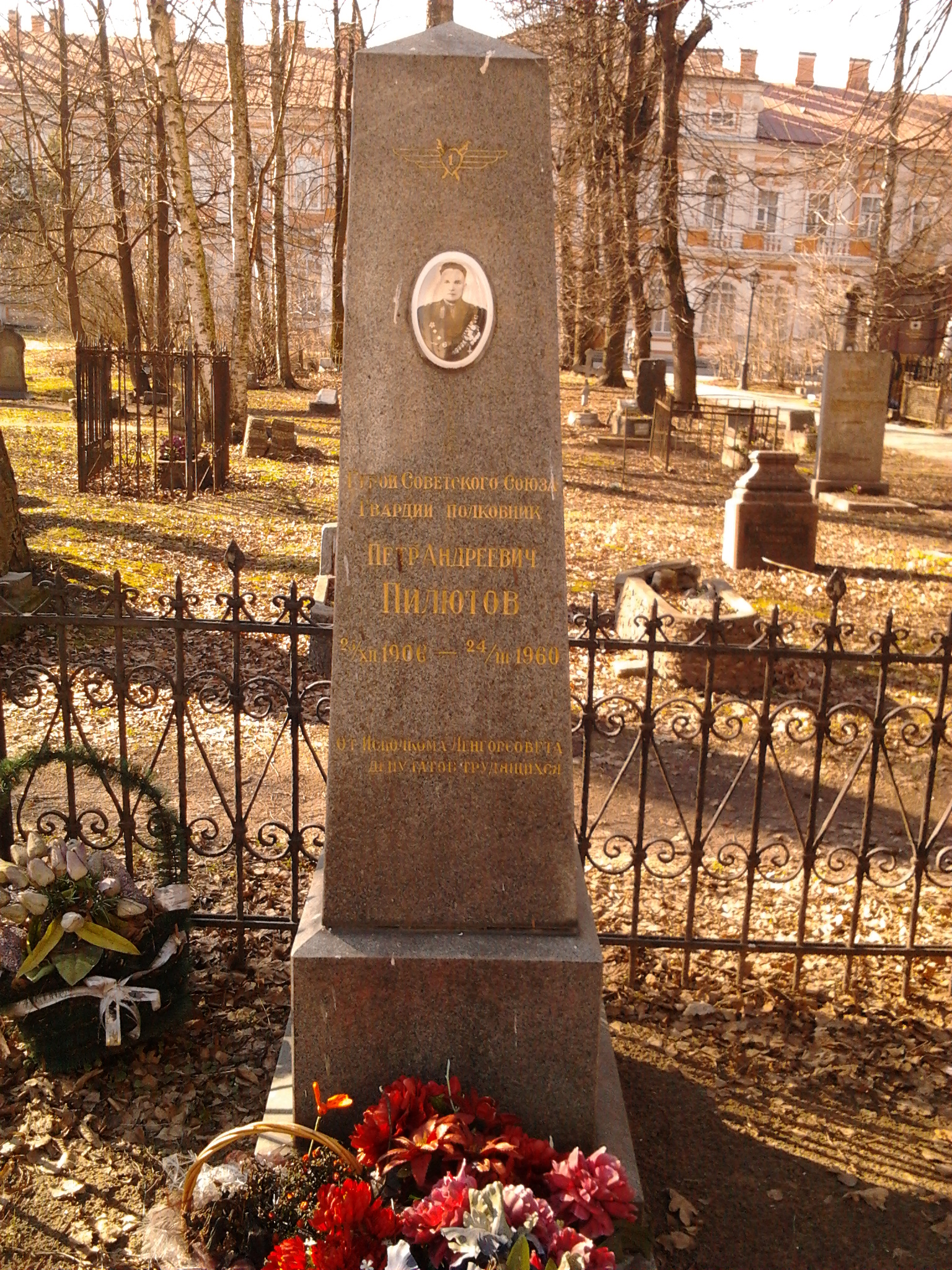
Pyotr Pilyutov's grave in Kazachye Cemetery.

Pilyutov continued to serve in the Soviet Air Force until retirement on 29 October 1955, achieving the rank of colonel and remaining as part of the reserves. Pilyutov would live in Leningrad until his death, working within military educational institutions for the Soviet Air Force. Pilyutov passed away in Leningrad on 24 March 1960, and was buried in Communist Square, now the Kazachye Cemetery.

In his memoirs, Alexander Novikov, the chief marshal of aviation of the Soviet Union during World War II, wrote that he was fond of Pilyutov, and provided accounts of Pilyutov's battles and life during and after the war.

== Awards ==
- 2x Order of the Red Star
- 4x Order of the Red Banner
- 4x Order of Lenin
- Order of the Patriotic War (1st Class)
- Order of the Patriotic War (2nd Class)
- Medal "For the Victory over Germany in the Great Patriotic War 1941–1945"
- Medal "For the Defence of Leningrad"
- Hero of the Soviet Union (#885)
- Order of the British Empire (Honorary)

== Memorials ==
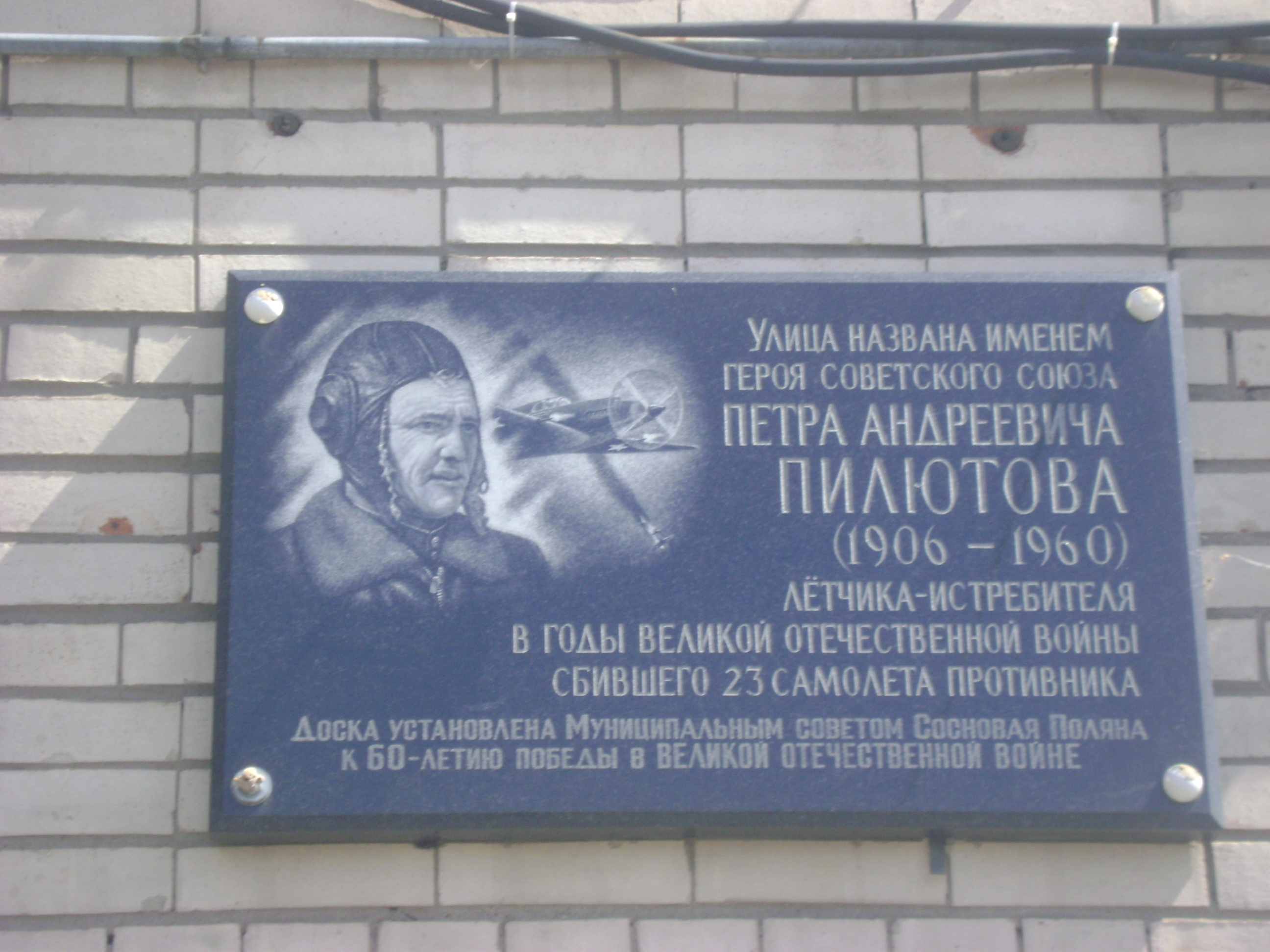
A memorial plaque found in Saint Petersburg on Pilyutov Street.

- A monument dedicated to Pilyutov in the Alley of Heroes in Pioneer Park, Rahachow, Belarus.
- Pilyutov is named in the "Breaking the Siege of Leningrad" display in Kirovsk, Leningrad Oblast.
- Pilyutova Park, in the city of Asha, Russia. A monument dedicated to Pilyutov was installed in 2019.
- Pilyutov Street, a north–south road in the Krasnoselsky District of Saint Petersburg named in 1964, with accompanying memorial plaques.
  - A museum on Pilyutov and other pilots at School No. 242 on Pilyutov Street.
