= Sergei Fyodorov (surgeon) =

Russian surgeon and urologist (1869–1936)

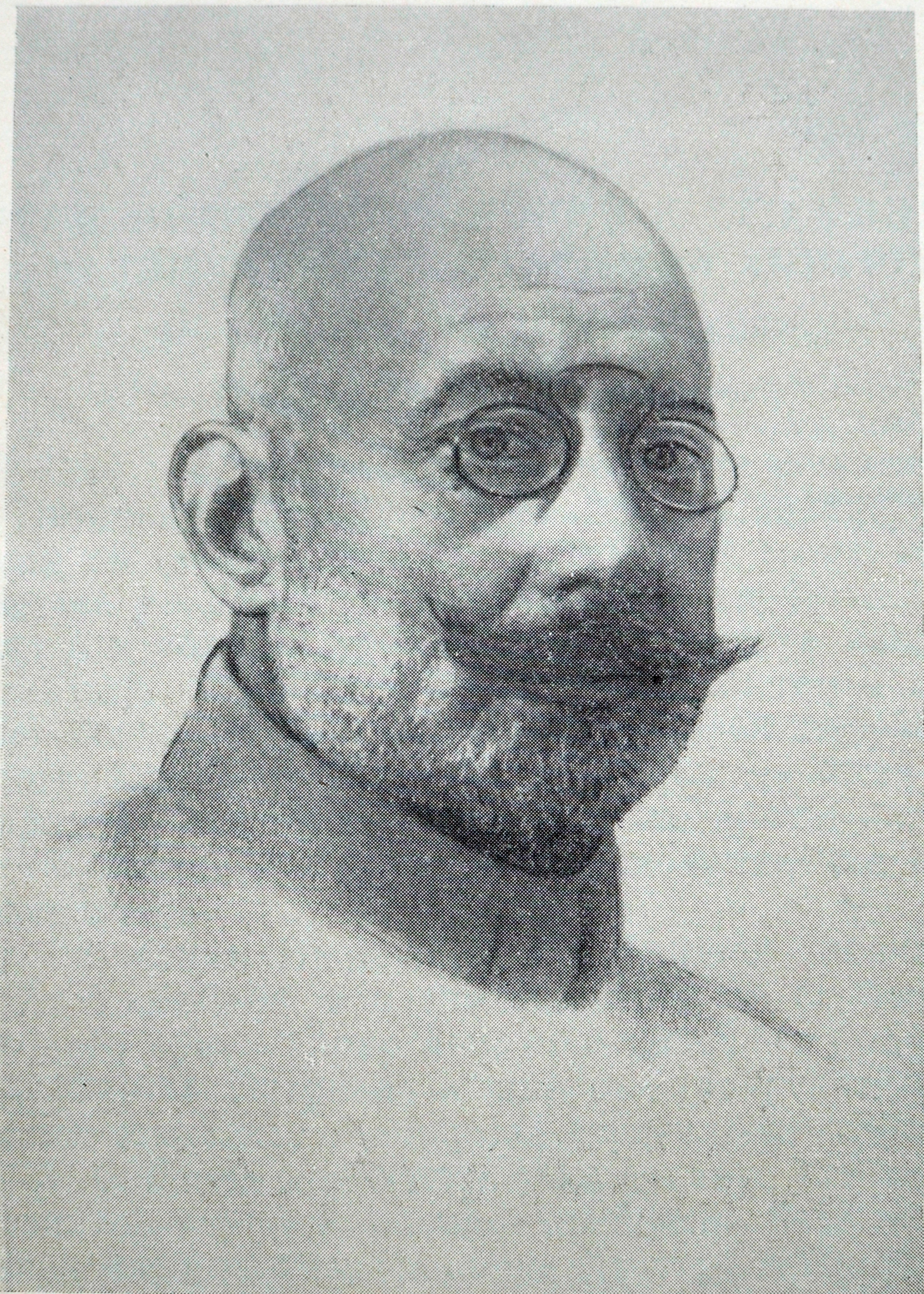
- Born: Sergey Petrovich Fedorov; 23 January 1869; Moscow, Russian Empire
- Died: 15 January 1936 (aged 66); Moscow, Soviet Union
- Education: Imperial Moscow University
- Known for: the founder of the Russian school of urology
- Awards: Russian Empire Order of Saint Stanislaus 3rd Class; Order of Saint Anna 3rd Class; Order of Saint Vladimir 3rd Class; USSR; Order of Lenin (1933) Honorary Scientist of the RSFSR (1928)
- Scientific career
- Fields: surgery, urology

Sergey Petrovich Fedorov (Russian: Серге́й Петро́вич Фёдоров; alternative English spelling: Sergey Petrovich Fyodorov) was a Russian Empire surgeon-urologist, professor of the Imperial Military Medical Academy (1903) and the Imperial Court Surgeon (1913). He is considered the founder of the largest national school of surgery and "the father of Russian urology".

== Biography ==
Sergey Petrovich Fedorov was born on 23 January 1869 in Moscow in the family of a surgeon Pyotr Nikitich Fedorov. Finished cum laude his studies in one of Moscow's Classical Gymnasiums, he was admitted to the Faculty of Medicine of the Imperial Moscow University, where he was a student of Professor Alexander Bobrov (1850 — 1904). Graduated cum laude in 1891, he practiced in Professor Bobrov's Clinic. In 1895 Sergey Fedorov was awarded with the degree of Doctor of Medicine. Later he studied in Germany under Curt Schimmelbusch and Leopold Casper.

In 1903 Sergey Fedorov was elected professor and head of the Subdepartment of Hospital Surgery at the Imperial Military Medical Academy in Saint Petersburg, the post he occupied till the end of his life.

Professor Fedorov was the founder and president of the Russian Urological Society (1907) and president of the International Congress of Urologists in Berlin (1914).

In 1909 Professor Fedorov was made the Honorary Surgeon of the Highest Court for professional achievements. In 1912 he became the Leib-Surgeon in actual duty. During World War I Professor Fedorov used to accompany the Emperor Nicholas II and the Tsarevich Alexei Nikolaevich in their travels to the front. He participated in the provision of emergency medical care to the heir to the Russian throne, who suffered from hemophilia. By 1917 Professor Fedorov held the rank of Privy Councilor (III grade of the Table of Ranks).

«The court surgeon developed a trusting relationship with the Russian Emperor. On the day he abdicated from the thrown, Nicholas II consulted with S. P. Fyodorov. Originally, the Emperor wanted to abdicate in favor of his son. However, the Leib-Surgeon had to report to the Emperor about the disappointing condition of the health of Alexei Romanov, who due to a severe hereditary disease could not ascend the throne. As a result, Nicholas II decided in favor of renunciation, including on behalf of his son».

After the October Revolution of 1917 Professor Fedorov refused to emigrate and stayed in the Soviet Russia. He was arrested a few times, but was finally released and went back to his medical practice at the Military Medical Academy.

In 1921 Professor Fedorov became one of the founders and editors of Novyi khirurgicheskii arkhiv, the first Soviet surgical journal. From 1929 to 1933, simultaneously with his work at the Military Medical Academy he also served as director of the Leningrad Institute of Surgical Neuropathology (now the A. L. Polenov Russian Neurosurgical Research Institute), the first such institute in the USSR. In 1933 Professor Fedorov became the first Soviet surgeon to be awarded with the Order of Lenin.

Sergey Fedorov died on 15 January 1936 in Moscow. He was buried in the Communist Cemetery of the Alexander Nevsky Lavra in Leningrad.

== Contribution to surgery ==
«Sergey Fedorov developed a combined clinical-physiological approach. His major studies dealt with the surgery of the urinary system and the bile ducts. The founder of the Russian school of urology, Professor Fedorov proposed new methods of diagnosis and developed new surgical instruments and techniques for operations on the kidneys and the urinary tract; for example, in 1899 he performed the first single-stage suprapubic prostatectomy. He also established urology as a separate medical specialty.

Sergey Fedorov was also concerned with neurosurgery and abdominal surgery. He developed new techniques and modified old ones for operating on the brain, the autonomic and peripheral nervous systems, the intestines, and the bile ducts. For example, he developed the Fedorov incision for gallbladder surgery and designed a special instrumentarium for trephination of the skull, clamps to stop hemorrhage in the dura mater, a proctoscope, and a set of instruments for surgery on the bile ducts. In 1893 — 1894 Fedorov was the first in Russia to prepare a tetanus antitoxin. He was also concerned with the surgical treatment of diseases of the esophagus and the lungs, with traumatology and military field surgery, and with oncology, anesthesiology, and blood transfusion».

On 7 December 1909 in the Clinic of Hospital Surgery of the Imperial Military Medical Academy Professor Fedorov used for the first time intravenous gedonal anesthesia (Hedonal) invented by Nikolai Kravkov. The success of non-inhalation anestesia impulsed the development of abdominal surgery in Russia.

While working in the Clinic of Hospital Surgery for more than 30 years, Professor Fedorov "introduced new surgical interventions, many of which were later named after him: one of the variants of pyelotomia (Fyodorov's operation), ways of intracapsular and subcapsular nephrectomy (Fyodorov surgery), a way to repair a lowered kidney (nephropexy by Fyodorov), operations for non-removable tumors of the cardia and lower third of the esophagus in cases involving total gastric cancer (Fyodorov's surgeries), a method for removing the gallbladder (Fyodorov's method), the original method for stitching of the liver and many others. For these procedures, S.P. Fyodorov developed original surgical instruments specifically designed for new urological surgery and for surgery of the liver and biliary tract. The scientific and practical achievements of the Russian surgeon S. P. Fyodorov became widely known not only in Russia, but far beyond its borders".

Professor Fedorov founded the largest national school of surgery, which included Vladimir Shamov, Vasily Dobrotvorsky, Nikolai Yelanskiy, Ivan Kolesnikov, Ivan Zhitnyuk, Nikolai Kukudzhanov, Izrail Talman, Andronik Chaika, Pyotr Kupriyanov, and others.

== Awards ==
=== Russian Empire ===
- Order of St. Stanislaus, 3rd class
- Order of St. Anna, 3rd class
- Order of St. Vladimir, 3rd class

=== Soviet Union ===
- Order of Lenin (1933)
- Honorary Scientist of the RSFSR (1928)

== Memory ==
There is a memorial plaque in honour of Sergey Fedorov on the building of the Clinic of Hospital Surgery at the S.M. Kirov Military Medical Academy in Saint Petersburg (Pirogovskaya Embankment, 3).

== Works ==
- Atlas tsistoskopii i rektoskopii. St. Petersburg, 1911.
- Khirurgiia pochek i mochetochnikov, fascs. 1–6. Moscow-Leningrad, 1923–1925.
- Khirurgiia na rasput’i. Moscow, 1927.
- Zhelchnye kamni i khirurgiia zhelchnykh putei, 2nd ed. Moscow-Leningrad, 1934.
