= Shuya Cathedral =

Orthodox church in Shuya, Russia

Coordinates: 56.8574°N 41.3833°E

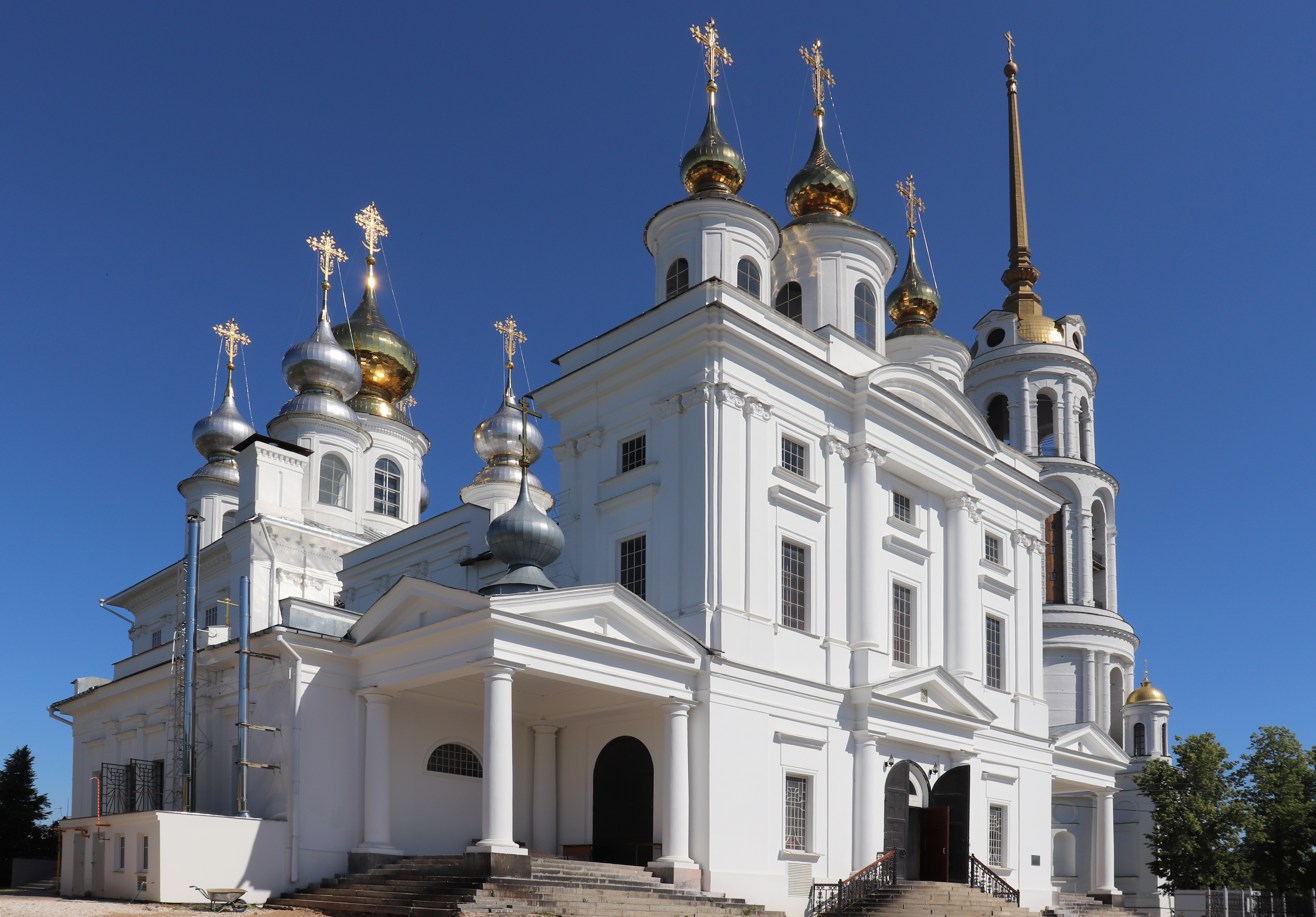

The Cathedral of the Resurrection of Christ (Воскресенский собор) is the cathedral church of Shuya (and the whole Shuya diocese (eparchy) of the Russian Orthodox Church). It was built in the 1790s.

The cathedral is known primarily on account of its 106-meter Neoclassical campanile, one of the tallest in Europe. It was built from 1810 until 1833 to a design by Gaudenzio Maricelli and still remains the tallest building in the Ivanovo Oblast. In 1891, a huge bell, weighing 1,270 poods (then the seventh largest bell in the Russian Empire), was raised to the third tier of the bell tower. The bell had been cast in Moscow at the expense of the manufacturer M. A. Pavlov.

On March 15, 1922, on the square in front of the Resurrection Cathedral, clashes occurred between Orthodox believers, who opposed the removal of church valuables from the temple, and government forces. Four believers were killed and several dozen believers and Red Army soldiers were wounded or beaten. These events are known as the Shuya Affair and mark the beginning of increased repression by Soviet authorities against the Russian Orthodox Church.

== Background ==
The well-known compiler of scribe books, Athanasius Vekov, in the inventory of the city of Shuya, written 1629, says that the wooden and very poor Church of the Resurrection was at the time a parish.

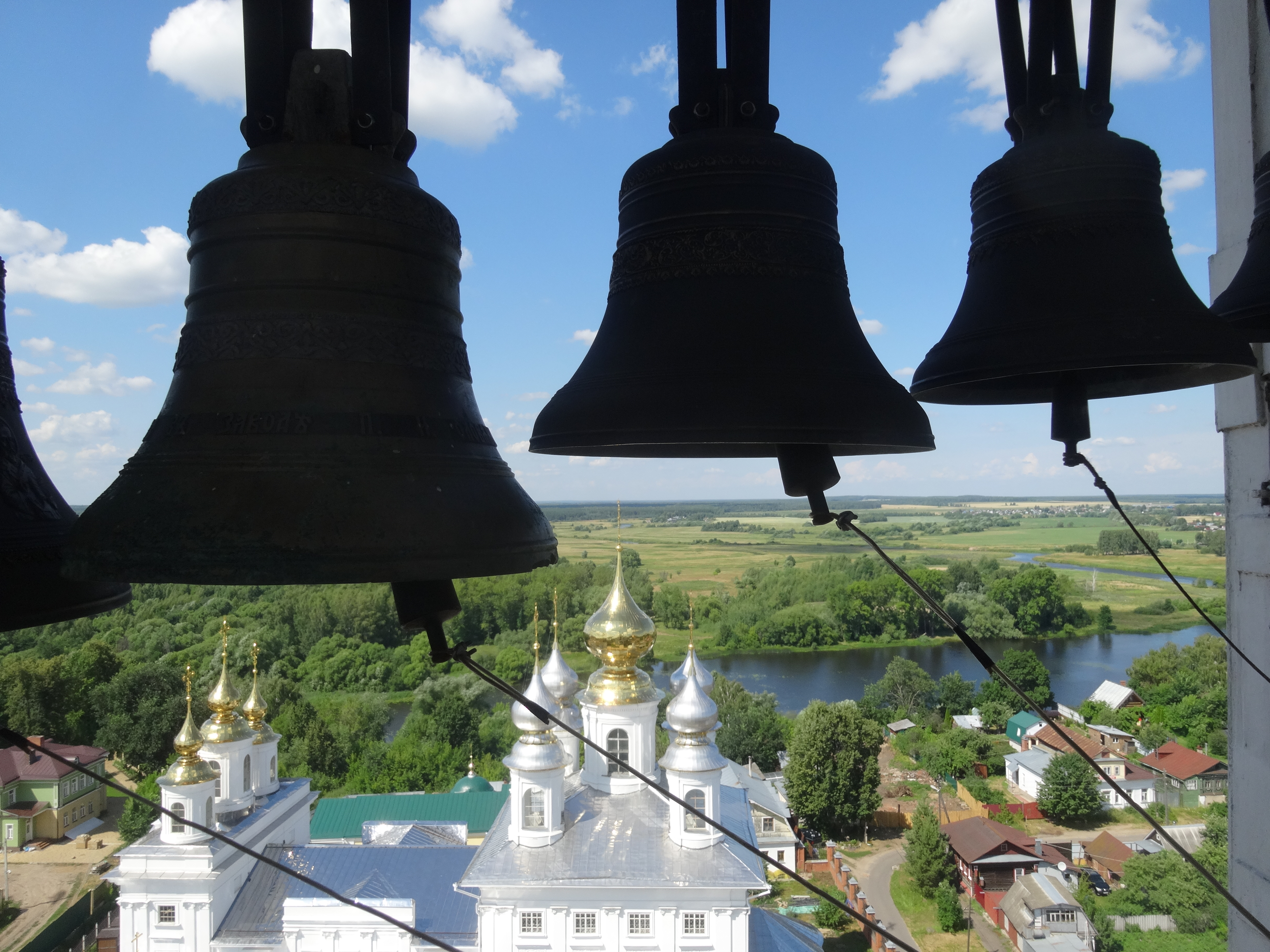
View of the church from the belltower

Gerasim Ikonnikov painted a version of the Smolensk Icon of the Mother of God for the church in 1655. The Church of the Resurrection was made a cathedral in 1667 due to the miracles that had been performed by the newly painted icon, which has since been called the Shuya-Smolensk Icon of the Mother of God. Soon after becoming a cathedral, through citizen's efforts, the five-domed stone Resurrection Cathedral Church was erected to replace the previously wooden church.

Both churches were destroyed during a fire on May 12, 1770. The cathedral was then rebuilt, and 22 years later it broke down due to dilapidation.

== History ==
The construction of the modern church continued in 1792–1798 at the expense of parishioners. On September 19, 1799, Bishop Victor of Vladimir and Suzdal consecrated the cathedral. The miraculous image that survived the fires was transferred to the temple. Soon after the consecration, the cathedral was decorated with paintings and the iconostasis with carvings and gilding, costing 12,000 rubles. The cathedral was crowned with five domes covered with gilded brass. The crosses on the heads were eight-pointed and made from the same metal.

In 1810 Gaudenzio Maricelli began construction of the bell tower of the Resurrection Cathedral. In 1819, the bell tower, built to the fourth tier, collapsed. Construction was completed in 1833 by a peasant from the Vladimir district, Mikhail Savateev, under the leadership of the provincial architect Evgraf Petrov. The height of the bell tower from the base to the tip of the cross was 49 fathoms 2 arshins, and the spire was10 fathoms 1 arshin. The spire was upholstered with white iron, and the apple and cross on it were gilded.

In 1912 to 1913, the temple was expanded: a new refectory was built and a three-domed church was erected above the western entrance.

At the end of the 19th century, the clergy consisted of an archpriest, two priests, a deacon, and three psalm-readers. There was a parochial school at the cathedral, opened in 1889.

== Soviet years and current state ==
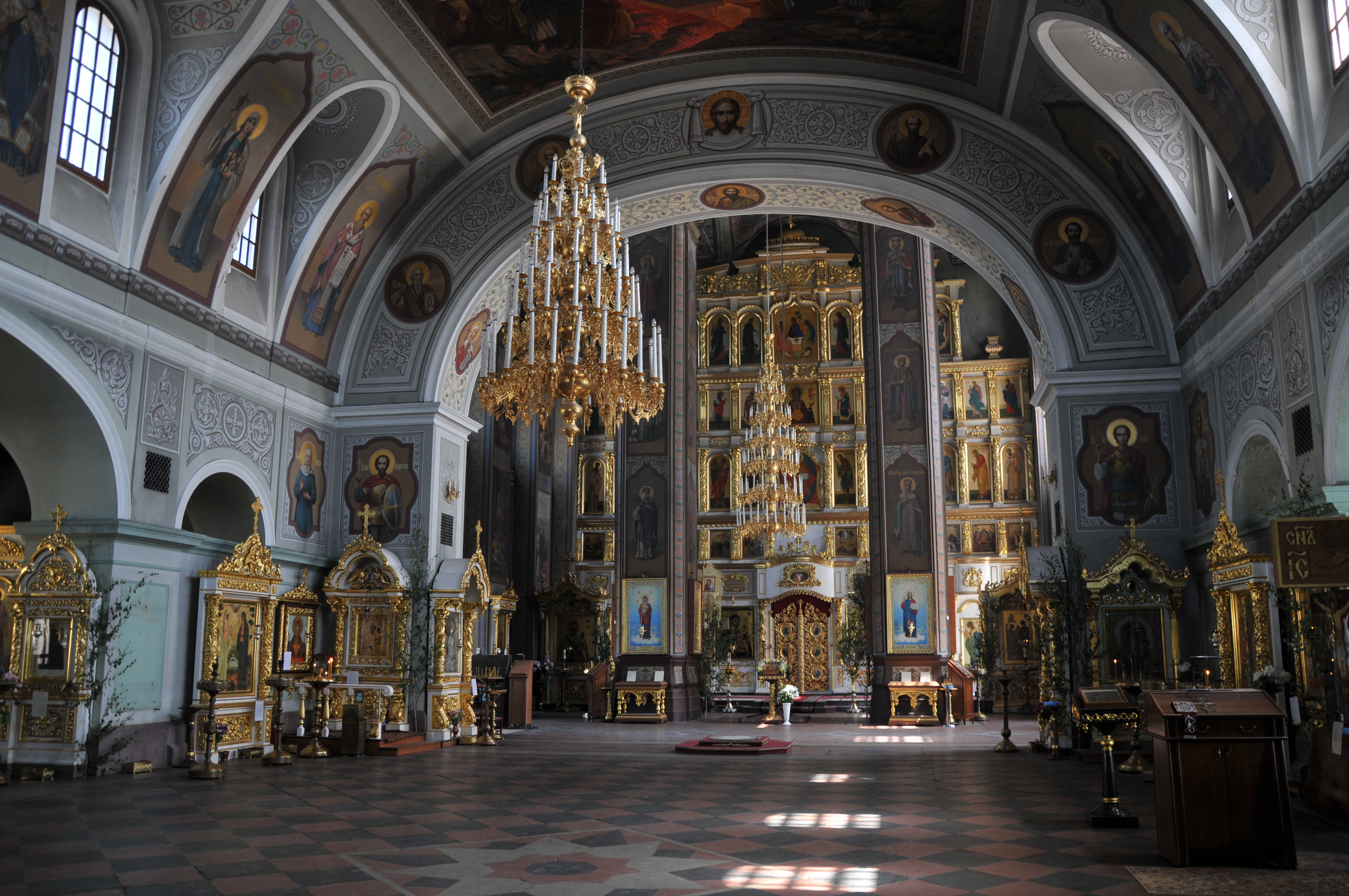
The interior

There is a monument to the clergy and laity killed while resisting the seizure of church liturgical valuables in the square in front of the bell tower of the Cathedral of the Resurrection of Christ created by sculptor Alexander Rukavishnikov. During the purge of the Russian Orthodox Church in 1922, Lenin, under the pretext of fighting mass famine in the Volga region, as well as others, announced the seizure of valuables and relics from cathedrals and churches. A county commission was created to seize valuables from the Resurrection Cathedral. On March 15, 1922, a crowd of agitated believers resisted the seizure of church valuables, in response Red Army soldiers began opening machine-gun and rifle fire on the crowd. As a result of the conflict, four believers were killed and ten injured in the so-called Shuya affair. On May 10, 1922, after a trial organized by the Bolsheviks, Archpriest Pavel Svetozarov, Priest John Rozhdestvensky, and layman Pyotr Yazykov were shot.

On October 2, 1937, the cathedral was closed by a resolution of the Ivanovo Regional Executive Committee.

In the summer of 1989, the Resurrection Cathedral was returned to the Russian Orthodox Church. For several years, the cathedral was considered a metochion of the Shartoma Monastery near Shuya.

Daily services are held and paintings and iconostasis have been restored. In 2012, the Shuya diocese was formed.
