= Holy Trinity Cathedral of the Alexander Nevsky Lavra =

Russian Orthodox cathedral in Saint Petersburg

Holy Trinity Cathedral of the Alexander Nevsky Lavra Свято-Троицкий собор Александро Невской лавры Svyato-Troitskiy Sobor Aleksandro Nevskogo lavry
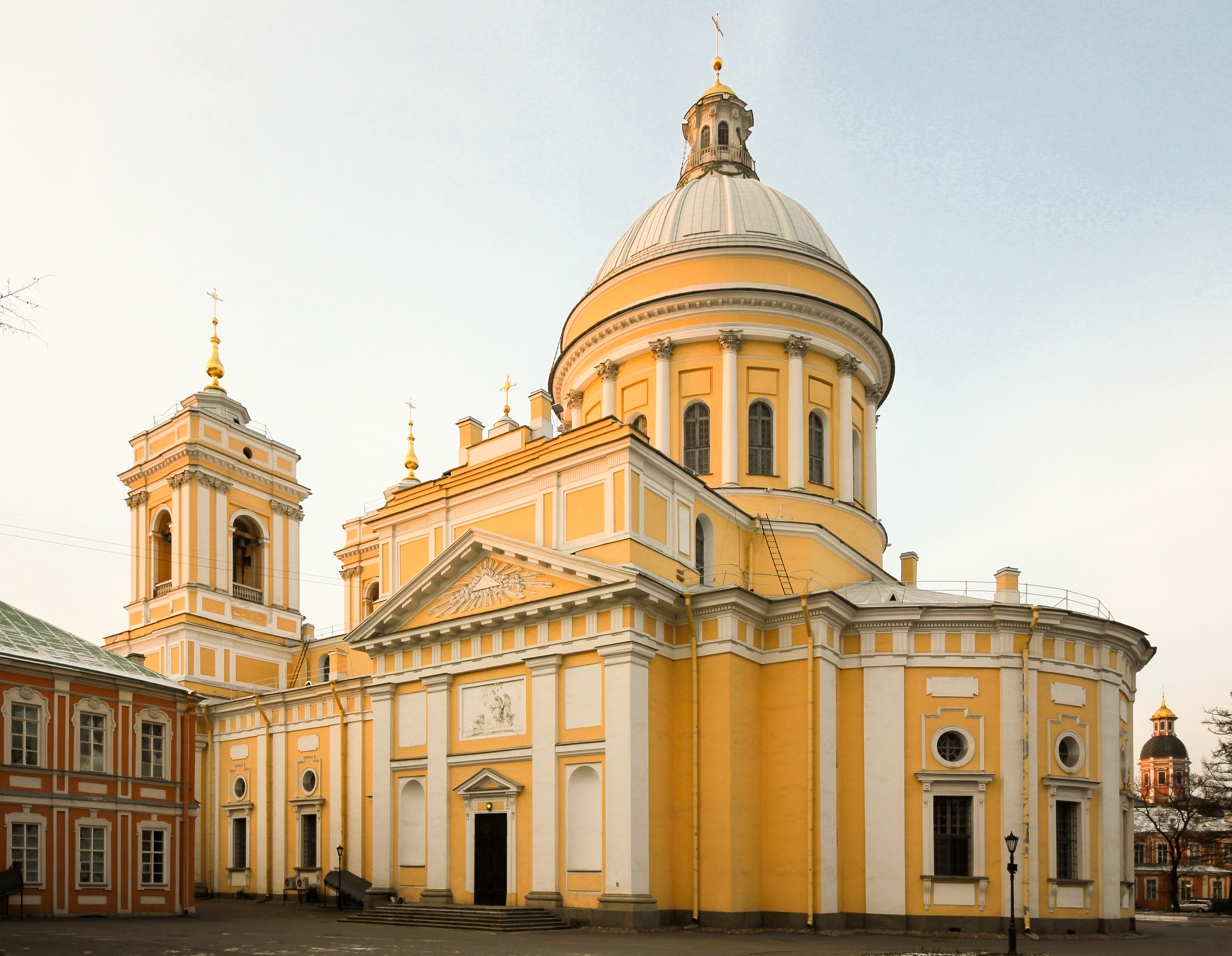

Religion
- Affiliation: Russian Orthodox

Location
- Location: Monastyrka Embankment 1, Saint Petersburg
- Interactive map of Holy Trinity Cathedral of the Alexander Nevsky Lavra; Свято-Троицкий собор Александро Невской лавры Svyato-Troitskiy Sobor Aleksandro Nevskogo lavry
- Coordinates: 59°55′16″N 30°23′20″E

Architecture
- Architect: Ivan Starov
- Style: Neoclassicism
- Groundbreaking: 1778
- Completed: 1790

Website
- www.lavra.spb.ru

The Holy Trinity Cathedral of the Alexander Nevsky Lavra (Russian: Свято-Троицкий собор Александро-Невской лавры) is a Russian Orthodox cathedral in Saint Petersburg. It is in the Diocese of Saint Petersburg and part of the Alexander Nevsky Lavra, where it is the cathedral church of the monastery complex.

The cathedral is the centre-piece of the ensemble of buildings that comprises the monastery complex. Work began on the cathedral in 1719, but as it was nearing completion severe cracks were discovered in the structure that threatened its stability, and the work was ordered to be demolished in 1744. A competition design early in the reign of Empress Catherine the Great failed to produce a suitable alternative, and it was not until 1774 that a design by Ivan Starov was selected. Construction began in 1778 and the cathedral was finally completed and consecrated in 1790. On the day of the consecration the relics of St Alexander Nevsky were ceremonially transferred to the cathedral in a grand ceremony.

The cathedral remained largely unchanged for much of its existence, its importance highlighted by the rich and valuable furnishings that were donated by the imperial family. It continued to operate after the Russian Revolution, though it suffered the loss of most of its historic artefacts during the general confiscation of Russian Orthodox Church property after 1922. After a period when it was run by the Renovationist movement, the cathedral was finally closed in 1933 and used as office space and as a warehouse. The cathedral was returned to the Orthodox Church in 1955 and was re-consecrated in 1957. The relics of St Alexander Nevsky were returned to the cathedral in 1989, and the cathedral has resumed its role as the principal church of the monastery.

== Construction ==
The first mention of the monastery complex is July 1710, when Peter the Great ordered the construction of a monastery to Saint Alexander Nevsky on a plot of land close to the present River Monastyrka, believing this to be the site of Alexander Nevsky's 1240 victory over the Swedes at the Battle of the Neva. The first buildings on the site were wooden constructions, with the first church, the Church of the Annunciation, consecrated on 25 March 1713, the date used as the official foundation date of the monastery. The general plans for the monastery complex had been drawn up by Domenico Trezzini, and construction began on the cathedral in 1719, to a design by architect Leonard Theodor Schwertfeger. The dome was installed by 17 June 1722 and work was nearing completion in 1731, when severe cracking was found on the supporting masonry. Work was stopped, and in 1744 orders were given to raze the building, Ivan Rossi overseeing its demolition down to its foundations between 1753 and 1755. Interest in completing the monastery complex waned, until Empress Catherine the Great acceded to the throne in 1762. In 1763 a competition to select the design of the cathedral was held, but none of the entrants was chosen. Finally eleven years later, in 1774, a design by Ivan Starov was selected, a single-domed cathedral in the neoclassic style.

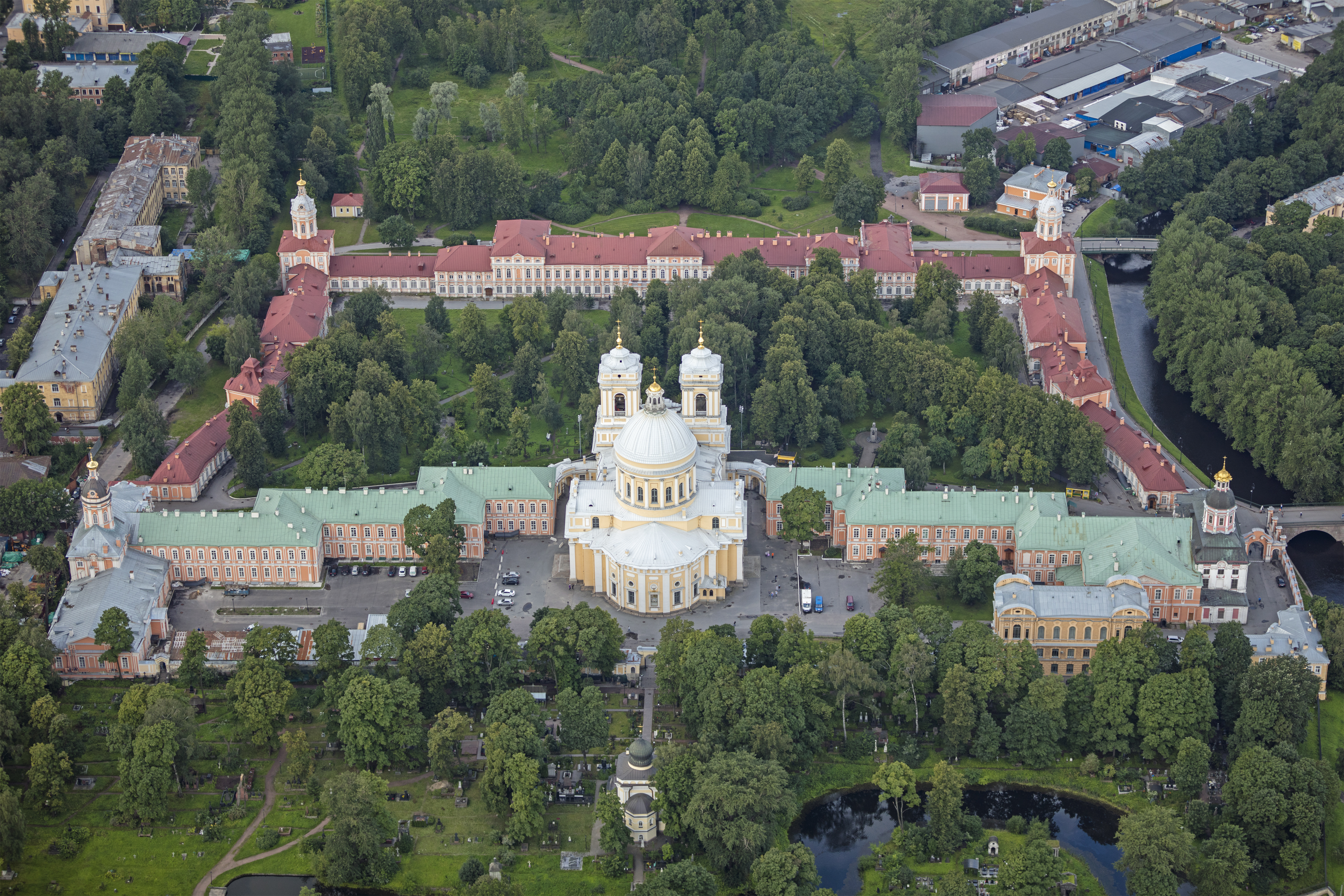
Aerial view of the Alexander Nevsky Lavra. The Holy Trinity Cathedral at centre dominates the monastic complex.

Empress Catherine approved the project in February 1776 and the groundwork was laid on 30 August 1778 by the Metropolitan Gabriel, in the presence of the Empress. The first bell tower was completed in 1782 and the main structure was finished by 1786. An 800-pood bell cast in 1658 was brought from the Valday Iversky Monastery and hung in the second tower. The cathedral was consecrated by Metropolitan Gabriel on 30 August 1790, the feast day of St Alexander Nevsky, in a ceremony attended by Empress Catherine. The relics of Alexander Nevsky were brought from the Annunciation Church to the cathedral to the accompaniment of cannon salutes. Empress Catherine celebrated the consecration by donating expensive utensils and Flemish tapestries to the cathedral. The Alexander Nevsky chapel under the south tower was consecrated on 9 October 1790, though it was later removed in 1838. In 1791 part of the Feodorovsky building nearest to the cathedral was converted into a hall for the Knights of the Order of St. Alexander Nevsky. In 1797 a relief was placed over the cathedral entrance.

== Design and interior ==
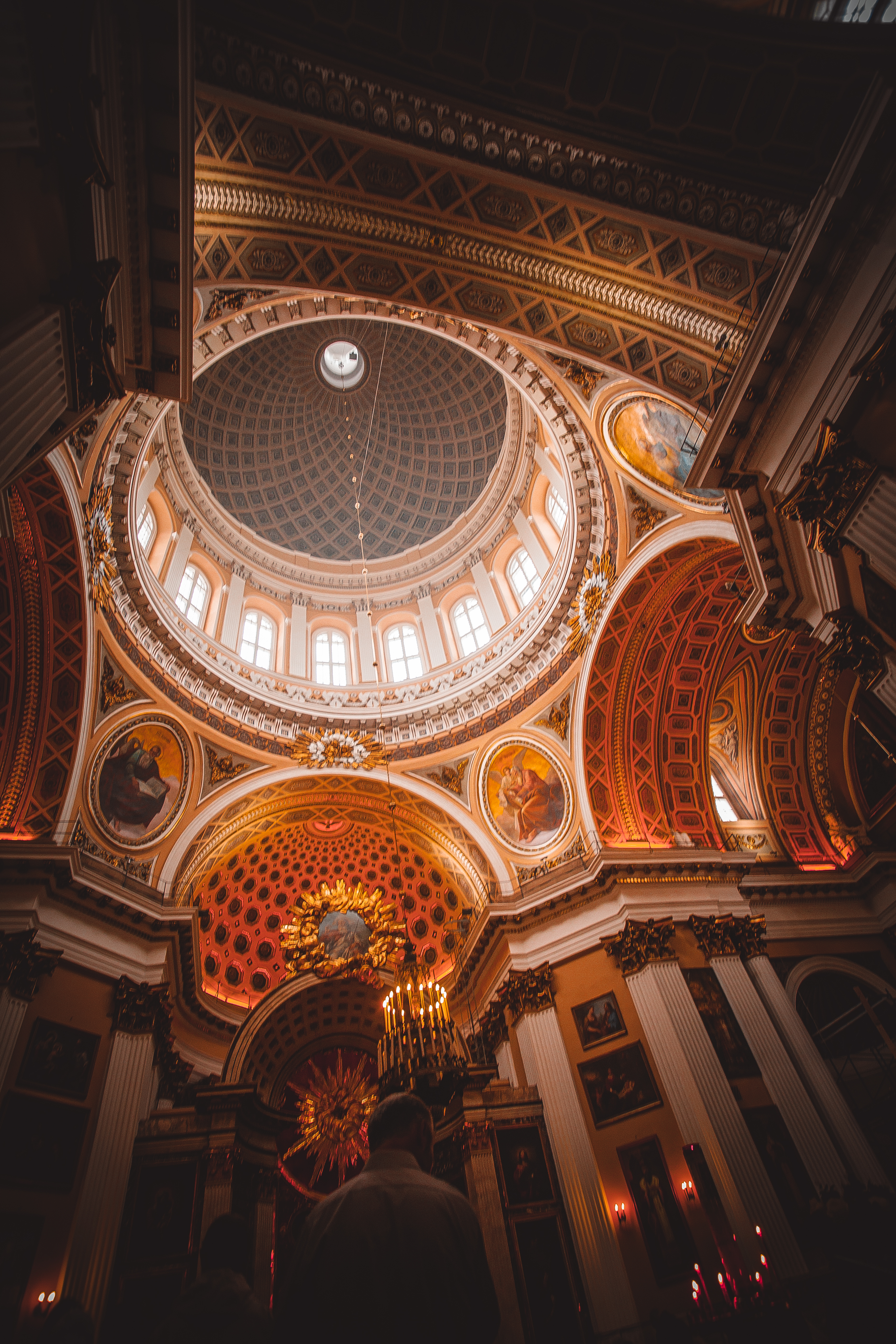
Cathedral interior, showing the arched vaulting of the naves and the dome

As completed the cathedral is surmounted by a single dome on a high drum, with two double-tiered bell towers on either side of the loggia of the central entrance. The main entrance consists of a portico of six Doric columns, with the facades consisting of shallow panels and pilasters. The north and south entrances are surmounted by bas-relief panels sculpted by Fedot Shubin, depicting events from the Old and New Testaments. The cathedral occupies a cruciform floor plan, with three naves. The main nave is supported by Corinthian columns, while the drum of the dome contains 16 windows. The iconostasis is made of marble, with images by Johann Jacob Mettenleiter and Ivan Akimov and bronze detailing by Pierre Agie. The cathedral interior was richly decorated with paintings, bas-reliefs and statues. Sculptor Fedot Shubin produced twenty bas-reliefs and statues of saints, while the altarpiece was by Anton Raphael Mengs. The original paintings were by Fyodor Danilov, though in 1806 Antonio della Giacomo replaced them using the sketches of Giacomo Quarenghi. The sculpting was entrusted to F. Lamoni and Giovanni Maria Fontana. A portrait of Catherine II by Dmitry Levitzky hung above the royal pew; on the opposite side hung a portrait of Peter the Great.

In 1794 Catherine II donated several valuable paintings by Peter Paul Rubens (Resurrection of Christ), Anthony van Dyck (Blessing of the Saviour), Jacob Jordaens (Lamentation), Jacopo Bassano, Guercino, Bernardo Strozzi and others from the Hermitage. She also later presented the church with a massive silver chandelier weighing about 13 pounds. Various relics and ornamental artefacts were collected in the cathedral, including the silver tomb of Alexander Nevsky, a piece of the Lord's Robe, and the image of the Theotokos of Vladimir.

The cathedral underwent several restorations during its existence, though its interiors remained largely as they were originally. The arches were repainted in 1862 by P. S. Titov, according to the sketches of Academician Fedor Solntsev. In 1847 a heating system was installed to allow the cathedral to operate in the winter. In 1862, a malachite canopy made in 1827–1828 in the Paris workshop of Pierre-Philippe Thomire was transferred to the cathedral from the Tauride Palace. Fifteen years later, a massive silver tomb was made under the shroud. In 1904, the main altar was lined with silver reliefs.

== Soviet period ==
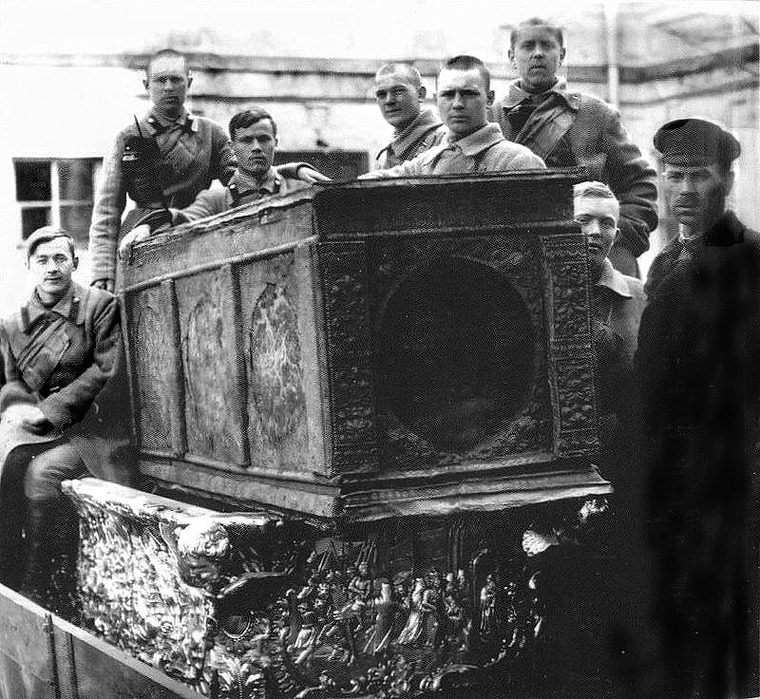
The silver sarcophagus of St Alexander Nevsky, removed from the cathedral in 1922

After the revolution, many of the valuables were removed from the cathedral and placed in museums, part of the state's general confiscation of Russian Orthodox Church property. The courtyard between the cathedral and the Metropolitan's house became a burial ground in 1917 called the Kazachye Cemetery, later the "Communist Square". The cathedral was operated between 1926 and 1933 by the Renovationist movement of the Orthodox Church, before a decision by the Leningrad Executive Committee on 16 August 1933 to close the cathedral. The last service was held on 7 December 1933, after which it passed to the House of Entertaining Science on 20 December that year. In the 1940s, part of the building was occupied by the first district housing authority of the Smolninsky District and the State Museum of Urban Sculpture, and the rest was used as a warehouse.

In 1955 the Holy Trinity Cathedral was returned to the Orthodox Church. It had sustained damage during the siege of Leningrad, and after repairs it was re-consecrated on 12 September 1957 by Metropolitan Eleutherius (Vorontsov). Further restoration works were carried out between 1957 and 1960, and 1986 and 1988. The relics of Alexander Nevsky were returned to the cathedral on 3 June 1989 from the Museum of the History of Religion and Atheism where they had been stored since 1922. The silver sarcophagus of Alexander Nevsky, which was transferred to the Hermitage Museum in 1922, remains there. The first monastic service was held at the Holy Trinity Cathedral on 14 September 1995, and on 3 November 1997, the parish assembly was abolished and the cathedral's monastic status was restored. In 2013 the 300th anniversary of the Monastery's founding was celebrated. Between 13 and 28 July 2017 some 500,000 people visited the cathedral to worship at the relics of Saint Nicholas, which were on loan from their permanent home in Bari.
