= Luchyn =

Luchyn Лучын (Belarusian)
- Agrotown
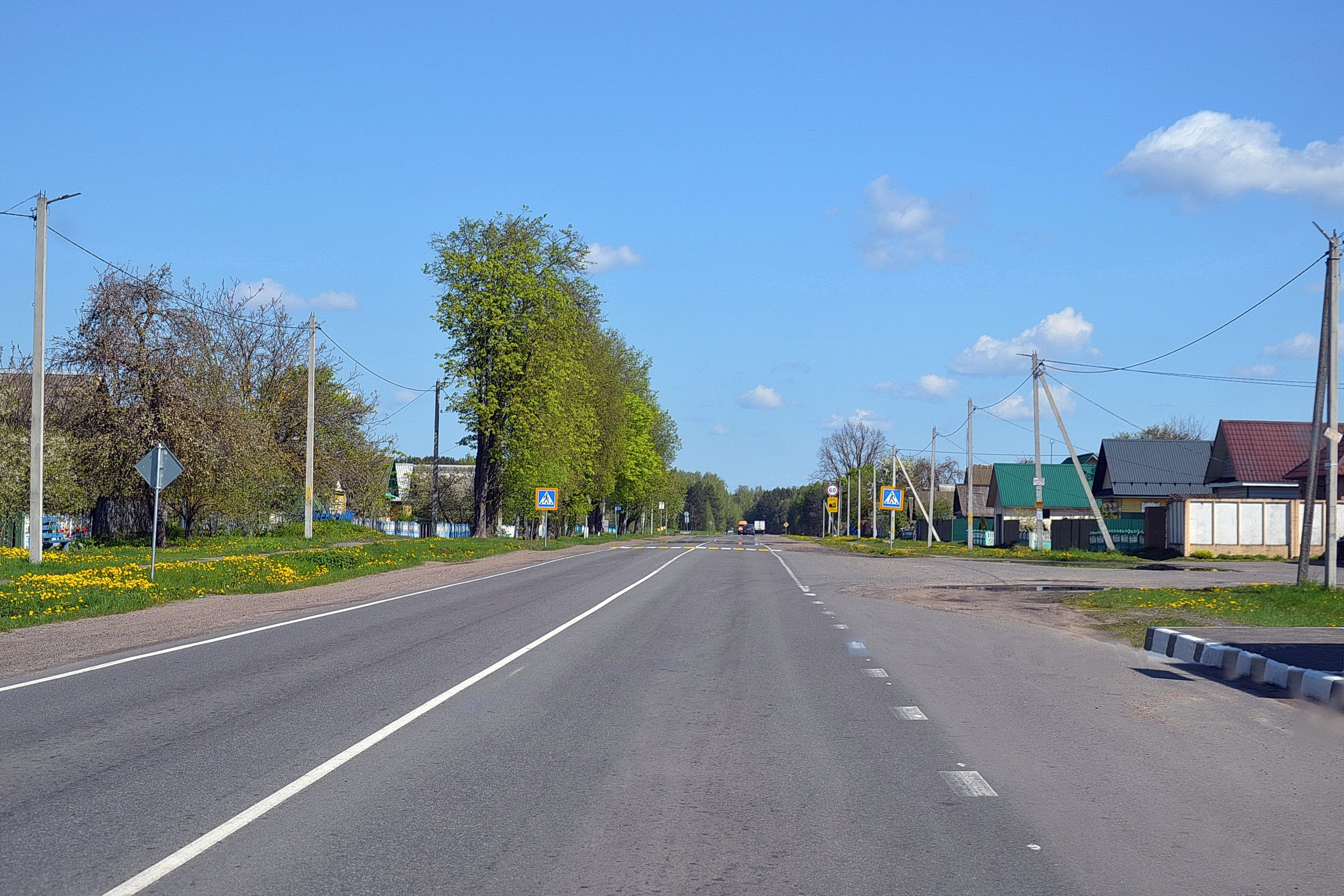
- The P-39 local road through Luchyn

- Location within Belarus
- Coordinates: 53°00′47″N 30°00′43″E
- Country: Belarus
- Region: Gomel Region
- District: Rahachow District
- Village council: Zabalatsky village council
- Elevation: 115 m (377 ft)
- Population (2004): 854
- Time zone: UTC+3 (MSK)
- Postal code: 247280
- Area code: +375 2339

Luchyn, or Luchin (Belarusian: Лучын; Russian: Лучин; Lithuanian: Lučinas; Polish: Łuczyn) is an agrotown located in the Zabalatsky village council of the Rahachow district of the Gomel region of Belarus. Luchyn is situated on the western bank of the Dnieper river, bisected by the P-39 local road. Luchyn is located 8 kilometres (5.0 mi) south of the city of Rahachow.

== History ==
The earliest mention of Luchyn in a contemporary record is a 4 March 1480 duty-free charter to a burgher (meshchanin) of Minsk named Lutse Tereshkovichy under the reign of Casimir IV Jagiellon during the Grand Duchy of Lithuania. The charter exempts Tereshkovichy from being charged taxes at the ports of certain towns along the Dnieper, including Luchyn. Luchyn was later mentioned in a 1548 letter from Bona Sforza to the governor of Rogachev regarding complaints of residents of Luchyn. Another mention occurred in 1593 as Luchyn was listed as affiliated with the Church of Saint Nicholas near cemeteries dedicated to the Kachytski family.

After the Second Partition of Poland in 1793, Luchyn was annexed from the Poland-Lithuanian Commonwealth by the Russian Empire and integrated into the Lukovskaya volost in the Rogachev Uezd of the Mogilev Governorate. In 1858, Dmitry Solomirsky owned property in Luchyn, notified within the census. In 1919, Luchyn and the Rogachev Uezd was transferred to the Gomel Governorate of the Soviet Union. Luchyn was absorbed into the Babruysk Uezd of the Gomel Governorate in 1924, before the territory was given to the Byelorussian Soviet Socialist Republic in 1926. Luchyn was integrated into the Babruysk Okrug on 26 July 1930. Luchyn became part of the Gomel region on 20 February 1938. Luchyn was the administrative center of the Luchyn village council of the Rahachow district from 20 August 1924 to the village council's abolition on 1 December 2009, being transferred to the Zabalatsky village council.

During Operation Barbarossa of World War II in 1941, Luchyn was invaded and partially burned by the Germans in 1941, and again in 1944 upon the German retreat following the Mogilev offensive of Operation Bagration by the Soviet Union. Luchyn was liberated by the Soviet Union on 26 June 1944 by the 1st Belorussian Front. A monument to Soviet soldiers and Luchyn villagers killed during the war was erected in Luchyn.

On 29 March 2011, Luchyn was designated as an agrotown.

Luchyn has been repeatedly studied for its archaeological relevance, as far back as 1896. According to Russian archaeologist E. R. Romanov, the town of Luchyn had discoveries of Kievan Rus'-era grand ducal silver rubles, a chest of similarly-aged silver articles, and two nearby forts containing remains of soldiers prior to 1912, and 130 burial mounds discovered in 1896. In 1956 and 1957, Neolithic and Bronze Age flint tools and ceramics were discovered and excavated at various sites around Luchyn. In the 21st century, the Belarusian Telegraph Agency reported on archaeological evidence discovered by the National Academy of Sciences of Belarus in July 2025 from sites around Luchyn indicating settlement since the 12th and 13th centuries, through roughly 400 discovered artifacts presumed to be from the High Middle Ages. During the 12th and 13th centuries, the area around Rahachow, including Luchyn, was at the border of the Kievan Rus' principalities of Smolensk, Polotsk and Chernigov. Additionally, Luchyn was along the route from the Varangians to the Greeks due to its proximity to the Dnieper.

== Notable people ==
- Pyotr Andreevich Pilyutov - Hero of the Soviet Union recipient and fighter ace for the Soviet Union during World War II.
- Nikita Grigorievich Brilev - Lieutenant general of the Soviet Union during World War II.

== Heritage listings ==
Luchyn contains the following cultural heritage listings, designated by the Belarusian government.

- Mass grave - 313Д000636
- Burial-mound cemetery of the Early Medieval period - 313В000637
- Hillfort of ancient Luchyn - 313В000638
- Hillfort 2 of the Early Medieval period - 313В000639
- Neolithic settlement (Site 1) - 313В000640
- Site 2 of the Neolithic and Bronze Age periods - 313В000641
- Site 3 of the Neolithic and Bronze Age periods - 313В000642
