= Hanko Naval Base =

Soviet naval base in Uusimaa region, Finland (1940-41)

Coordinates: 59.835608°N 22.995666°E

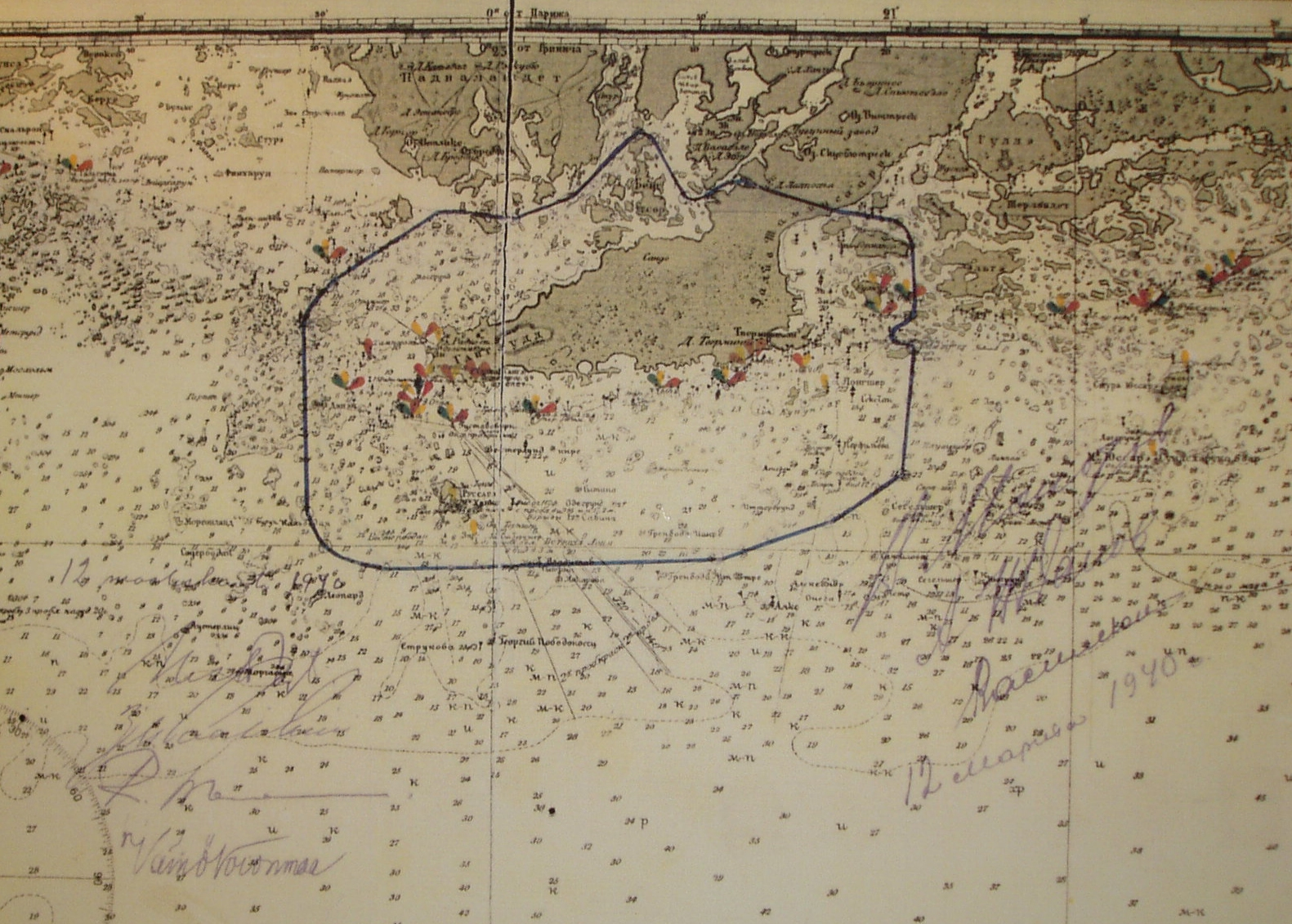
Hanko Naval Base location on a map

Hanko Naval Base was a short-lived Soviet naval base on the southern coast of Finland, operational for less than two years in the early 1940s. The base was located in the town of Hanko on the Hanko Peninsula, which is located 100 kilometers (62 mi) from Helsinki, the Finnish capital.

== History ==
The Soviet Union had demanded from Finland a military base in the writing of regional exchange requirements just before outbreak of the Winter War from Hanko peninsula.

In October 1939 Geoffrey Cox was told that the Finnish General Staff were prepared to cede even the Petsamo area, but not Hanko, which they knew in Russian hands would be a pistol pressed into Finland’s back, and which was the real key to the Gulf of Finland. The Russians were prepared to hand over in return some territory just north of the Finnish “waist-line”: - stretches of forest of no military value.

After the Winter War, in the early Spring of 1940, the Soviet Union repeated its call for a naval base in the Hanko area.

Finland's negotiation delegation was forced to agree to the Soviet Union's peace terms, including the Hanko base. On March 12, 1940, the Moscow Peace Treaty included a lease to the Soviet Union, for 30 years, of 115 square kilometers of territory which included the area of the Hanko Peninsula and the city of Hanko surrounding maritime areas, as well as about 400 islands.

The area was handed over to the Soviets at Midnight on 22 March 1940. The Finnish population had been evacuated from the area, causing about 8,000 Finns to lose their homes. Soviet Union forces built a strong military base. It oversaw maritime traffic in the Gulf of Finland, and was also a potential south-west invasion front for war against Finland. The base housed infantry, airborne and armored forces. The Soviet Union fortified the border between Finland and the base, and the Finnish forces invested in troops and fortifications on their side.

== Outbreak of the Continuation War ==
Battles of the Continuation War that took place at the borders of the leased area were quite limited. The Finns did not try to assault the Hanko Soviet forces. However, the Soviet Union withdrew its troops from the leased area on December 2, 1941. The troops left their leased area heavily mined, which hampered the return of the civilian population in the Hanko peninsula.

After the Continuation War, the Soviet Union demanded instead of Hanko a lease area in Porkkala. The final turnover of the Hanko leased area was included in the Paris Peace Agreement in 1947.
