= 1922 seizure of church valuables in Russia =

Forcible Appropiation or Church Valuables

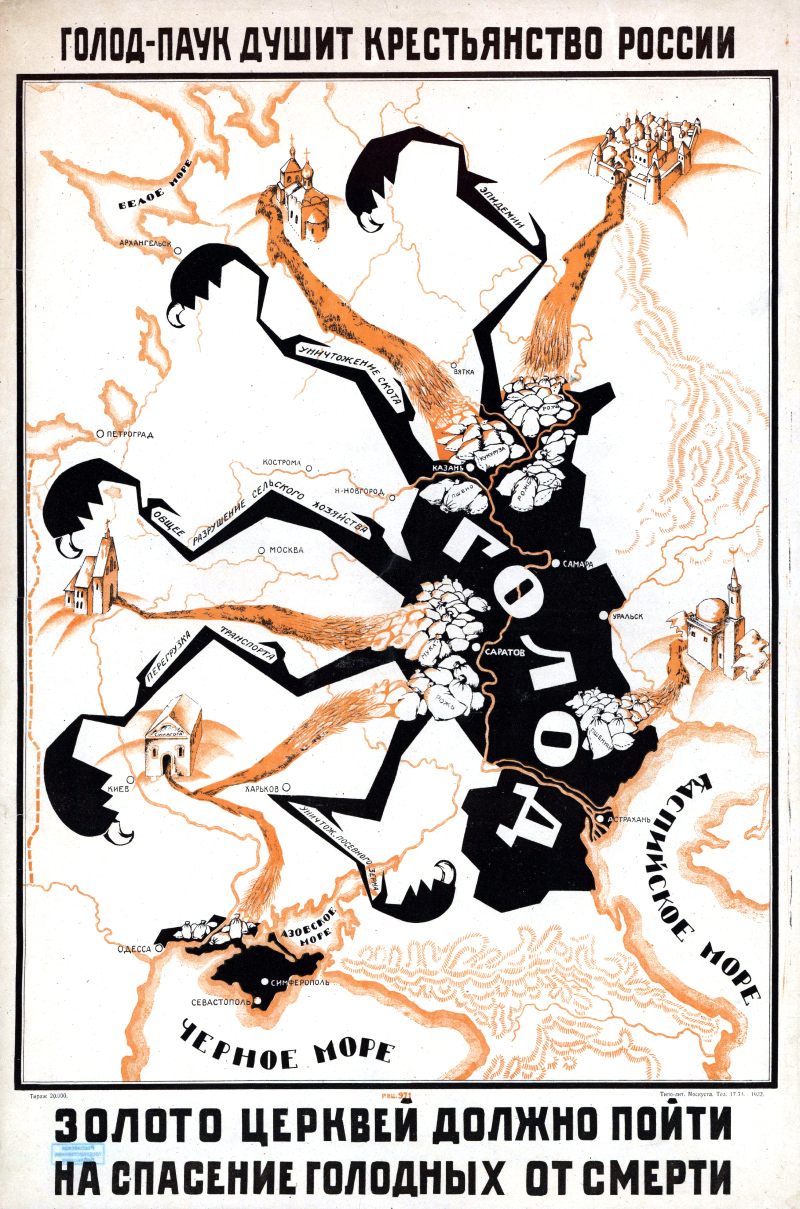
1922 Russian famine aid poster. The caption above the image: «Hunger-spider strangles the peasantry of Russia». Image caption: «Churches gold should go to save the hungry from death»

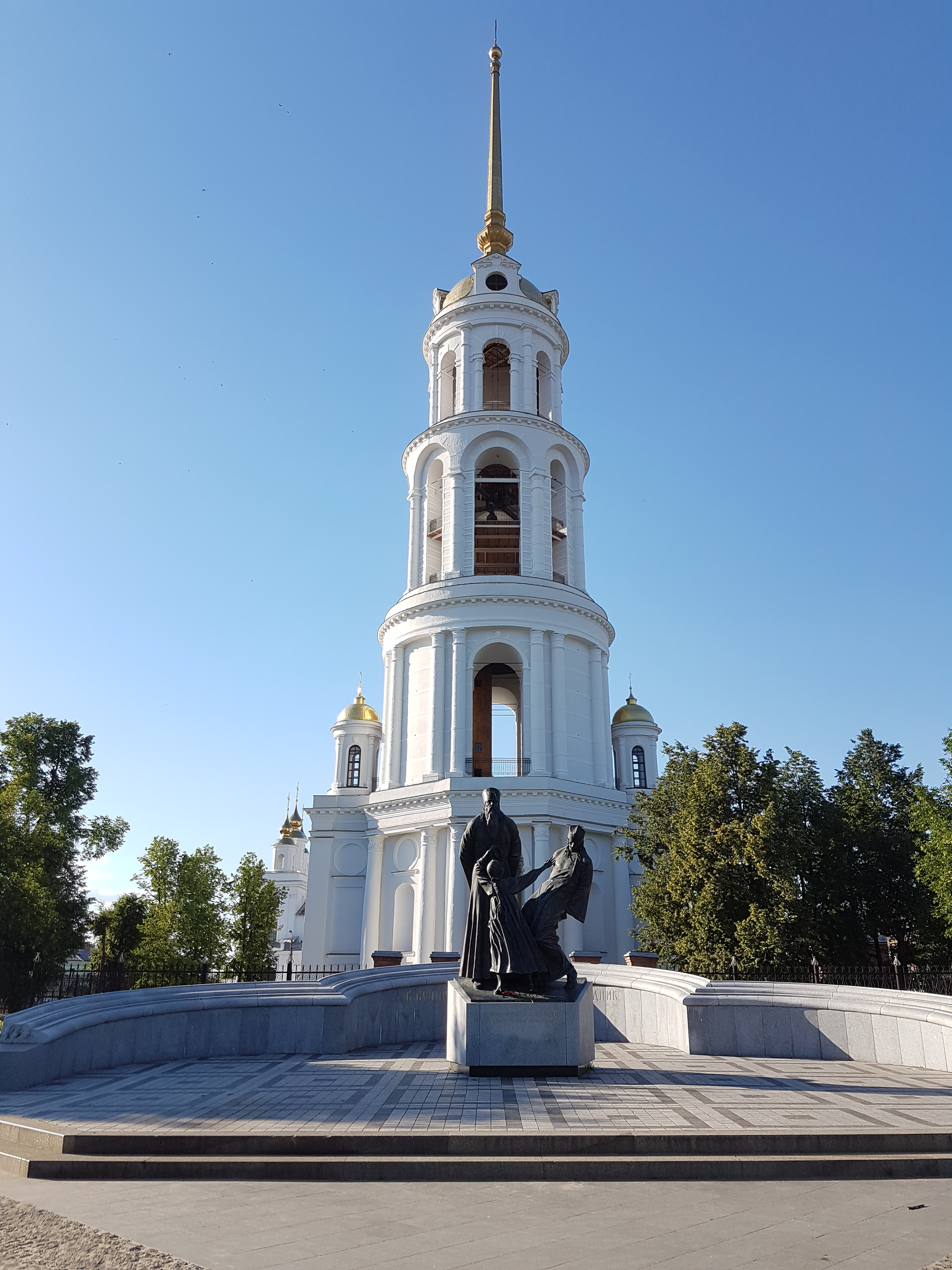
Monument to clergy and laity killed during resistance during the removal of jewelry from churches to help those suffering from Soviet-induced famine. Shuya, the square in front of the Cathedral of the Resurrection of Christ

The 1922 removal of jewelry from churches in Russia was held by the Bolshevik government of the Russian Soviet Federative Socialist Republic to combat the Russian famine of 1921–1922. During 1922, precious metals and gems were removed by state authorities from churches of all denominations.

== History ==
On February 5, 1918, the Soviet government issued the Decree on Separation of Church from State and School from Church. According to this document, all property of existing church and religious societies in Russia was nationalized and became public property; buildings and objects intended specifically for religious purposes were, by special decree of local or central government, leased free of charge to the respective religious societies. The Decree displeased the leadership of the Russian Church. On February 28, 1918, Patriarch Tikhon and the Synod of the Russian Church issued a message instructing the clergy to begin a struggle against the Decree. The message said that in order to protect the Church and its property, it is necessary to organize unions (collectives) at all churches from the parishioners, which should protect the holy places and church property from encroachment. Some believers tried to resist when representatives of the state made an inventory of the property of churches and monasteries. Resistance was crushed, and resistance activists ended up in the dock (Samarin-Kuznetsov trial). In 1921, famine began in Russia. Means were needed to purchase bread abroad, but the Republic of Soviets did not have them. There was an idea to use for this purpose part of the values concentrated in the churches. On February 23, 1922, the All-Russian Central Executive Committee issued a decree «On the Seizure of Church Jewelry». The decree ordered the local organs of Soviet power to remove from the churches all products made of gold, silver and precious stones and transfer them to the Central Fund for the Relief of the Starving. Patriarch Tikhon hindered of the removal of jewelry from churches. He believed that church utensils according to church canons belong to God and the Church and issued a message to believers on February 28, 1922. In the message, he forbade the seizure of sacred objects, the use of which is not for liturgical purposes, and called this act «svyatotatstvo» – stealing of sacred things. According to the patriarch, for such an action, the laity should be excommunicated, and clergymen are to be expelled from the dignity. To substantiate his opinion, the patriarch referred to the 73 canon of the apostles and the 10 canon of the Protodeutera Council. The consequence of the message of the patriarch was a clash between representatives of power and believers. The most famous armed clash occurred in Shuya. Here, a crowd of believers, armed with wooden stakes, tried not to let the representatives of power to seize church jewelry to help the starving. The authorities opened fire, as a result, 4 people were killed and several wounded. After the events in Shuya, trials took place, at which direct participants in the events and Patriarch Tikhon as the author of the message appeared on the dock.

The company of the removal of jewelry from churches in Russia for the help of the hungry was completed on May 26, 1922.

According to The New York Times, eight priests, two laymen and one woman were sentenced to death in Moscow on May 8, 1922, for having opposed the requisitioning of Church treasures.
