= Vasilyevskoye, Shuysky District =

Vasilyevskoye Васильевское
- Village
- Location within Ivanovo Oblast Location within Russia
- Coordinates: 56°55′N 41°39′E
- Country: Russia
- Region: Ivanovo Oblast
- District: Shuysky District
- Time zone: UTC+3:00

Vasilyevskoye (Russian: Васильевское) is a rural locality (a selo) in Shuysky District, Ivanovo Oblast, Russia. Population: 1,100 (2010 census);

== Geography ==
This rural locality is located 19 kilometres (12 mi) from Shuya (the district's administrative centre), 43 kilometres (27 mi) from Ivanovo (capital of Ivanovo Oblast) and 278 kilometres (173 mi) from Moscow. Krokhino-Novoye is the nearest rural locality.
