= Dvorishki Bolshiye =

Dvorishki Bolshiye Дворишки Большие
- Village
- Location within Ivanovo Oblast Location within Russia
- Coordinates: 56°58′N 41°31′E
- Country: Russia
- Region: Ivanovo Oblast
- District: Shuysky District
- Time zone: UTC+3:00

Dvorishki Bolshiye (Russian: Дворишки Большие) is a rural locality (a village) in Shuysky District, Ivanovo Oblast, Russia. Population: 18 (2010 census);

== Geography ==
This rural locality is located 16 kilometres (9.9 mi) from Shuya (the district's administrative centre), 34 kilometres (21 mi) from Ivanovo (capital of Ivanovo Oblast) and 273 kilometres (170 mi) from Moscow. Pyryevka is the nearest rural locality.
