= Cherntsy, Shuysky District =

Cherntsy Чернцы
- Village
- Location within Ivanovo Oblast Location within Russia
- Coordinates: 56°56′N 41°20′E
- Country: Russia
- Region: Ivanovo Oblast
- District: Shuysky District
- Time zone: UTC+3:00

Cherntsy (Russian: Чернцы) is a rural locality (a village) in Shuysky District, Ivanovo Oblast, Russia. Population: 496 (2010 census);

== Geography ==
This rural locality is located 10 kilometres (6.2 mi) from Shuya (the district's administrative centre), 24 kilometres (15 mi) from Ivanovo (capital of Ivanovo Oblast) and 262 kilometres (163 mi) from Moscow. Panyutino is the nearest rural locality.
