= Semyonovo, Shuysky District =

Semyonovo Семёново
- Village
- Location within Ivanovo Oblast Location within Russia
- Coordinates: 56°49′N 41°36′E
- Country: Russia
- Region: Ivanovo Oblast
- District: Shuysky District
- Time zone: UTC+3:00

Semyonovo (Russian: Семёново) is a rural locality (a village) in Shuysky District, Ivanovo Oblast, Russia. Population: 17 (2010 census);

== Geography ==
This rural locality is located 14 kilometres (8.7 mi) from Shuya (the district's administrative centre), 43 kilometres (27 mi) from Ivanovo (capital of Ivanovo Oblast) and 270 kilometres (170 mi) from Moscow. Tryasuchevo is the nearest rural locality.
