= Goryanovo =

Goryanovo Горяново
- Village
- Location within Ivanovo Oblast Location within Russia
- Coordinates: 56°48′N 41°13′E
- Country: Russia
- Region: Ivanovo Oblast
- District: Shuysky District
- Time zone: UTC+3:00

Goryanovo (Russian: Горяново) is a rural locality (a village) in Shuysky District, Ivanovo Oblast, Russia. Population: 18 (2010 census);

== Geography ==
This rural locality is located 10 kilometres (6.2 mi) from Shuya (the district's administrative centre), 25 kilometres (16 mi) from Ivanovo (capital of Ivanovo Oblast) and 249 kilometres (155 mi) from Moscow. Brylikha is the nearest rural locality.
