= Petrilovo, Ivanovo Oblast =

Petrilovo Петрилово
- Village
- Location within Ivanovo Oblast Location within Russia
- Coordinates: 56°51′N 41°14′E
- Country: Russia
- Region: Ivanovo Oblast
- District: Shuysky District
- Time zone: UTC+3:00

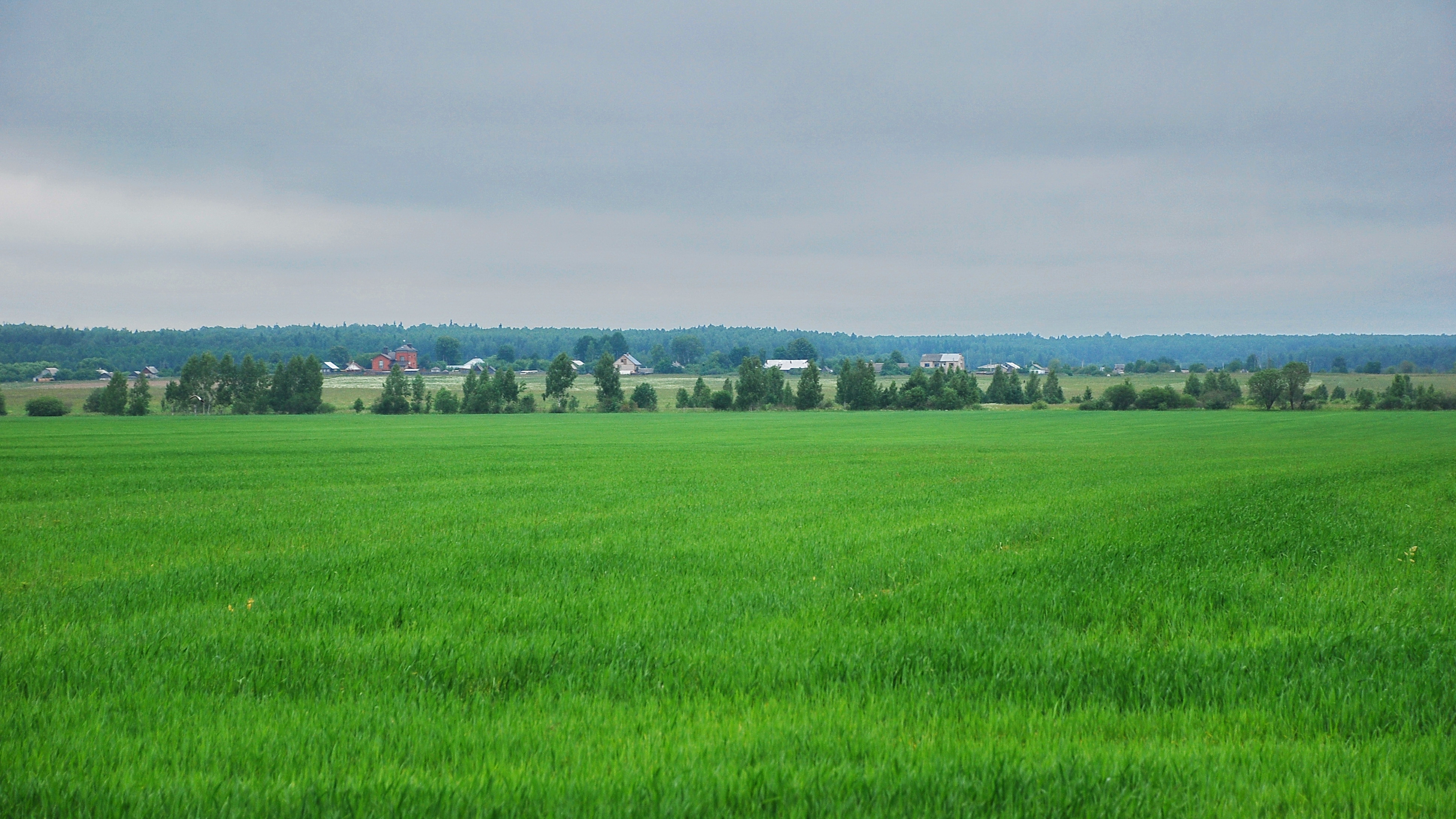
View of Petrilovo from Drozdovo

Petrilovo (Russian: Петрилово) is a rural locality (a village) in Shuysky District, Ivanovo Oblast, Russia. Population: 26 (2010 census);

== Geography ==
This rural locality is located 9 kilometres (5.6 mi) from Shuya (the district's administrative centre), 22 kilometres (14 mi) from Ivanovo (capital of Ivanovo Oblast) and 252 kilometres (157 mi) from Moscow. Gorlitsino is the nearest rural locality.
