= Vasilevo, Shuysky District =

Vasilevo Василево
- Village
- Location within Ivanovo Oblast Location within Russia
- Coordinates: 56°45′N 41°21′E
- Country: Russia
- Region: Ivanovo Oblast
- District: Shuysky District
- Time zone: UTC+3:00

Vasilevo (Russian: Василево) is a rural locality (a village) in Shuysky District, Ivanovo Oblast, Russia. Population: 8 (2010 census);

== Geography ==
This rural locality is located 11 kilometres (6.8 mi) from Shuya (the district's administrative centre), 35 kilometres (22 mi) from Ivanovo (capital of Ivanovo Oblast) and 253 kilometres (157 mi) from Moscow. Tsentralny is the nearest rural locality.
