= Pustosh, Shuysky District =

Pustosh Пустошь
- Village
- Location within Ivanovo Oblast Location within Russia
- Coordinates: 56°50′N 41°37′E
- Country: Russia
- Region: Ivanovo Oblast
- District: Shuysky District
- Time zone: UTC+3:00

Pustosh (Russian: Пустошь) is a rural locality (a village) in Shuysky District, Ivanovo Oblast, Russia. Population: 662 (2010 census);

== Geography ==
This rural locality is located 14 kilometres (8.7 mi) from Shuya (the district's administrative centre), 43 kilometres (27 mi) from Ivanovo (capital of Ivanovo Oblast) and 272 kilometres (169 mi) from Moscow. Kudryakovo is the nearest rural locality.
