= Parshigino =

Parshigino Паршигино
- Village
- Location within Ivanovo Oblast Location within Russia
- Coordinates: 56°47′N 41°30′E
- Country: Russia
- Region: Ivanovo Oblast
- District: Shuysky District
- Time zone: UTC+3:00

Parshigino (Russian: Паршигино) is a rural locality (a village) in Shuysky District, Ivanovo Oblast, Russia. Population: 70 (2010 census);

== Geography ==
This rural locality is located 9 kilometres (5.6 mi) from Shuya (the district's administrative centre), 39 kilometres (24 mi) from Ivanovo (capital of Ivanovo Oblast) and 263 kilometres (163 mi) from Moscow. Maksimikha is the nearest rural locality.
