= Myagkovo =

Myagkovo Мягково
- Village
- Location within Ivanovo Oblast Location within Russia
- Coordinates: 56°41′N 41°22′E
- Country: Russia
- Region: Ivanovo Oblast
- District: Shuysky District
- Time zone: UTC+3:00

Myagkovo (Russian: Мягково) is a rural locality (a village) in Shuysky District, Ivanovo Oblast, Russia. Population: 73 (2010 census);

== Geography ==
This rural locality is located 17 kilometres (11 mi) from Shuya (the district's administrative centre), 41 kilometres (25 mi) from Ivanovo (capital of Ivanovo Oblast) and 252 kilometres (157 mi) from Moscow. Kolobovo is the nearest rural locality.
