= Chernyatkino =

Chernyatkino Черняткино
- Village
- Location within Ivanovo Oblast Location within Russia
- Coordinates: 56°46′N 41°37′E
- Country: Russia
- Region: Ivanovo Oblast
- District: Shuysky District
- Time zone: UTC+3:00

Chernyatkino (Russian: Черняткино) is a rural locality (a village) in Shuysky District, Ivanovo Oblast, Russia. Population: 24 (2010 census);

== Geography ==
This rural locality is located 16 kilometres (9.9 mi) from Shuya (the district's administrative centre), 46 kilometres (29 mi) from Ivanovo (capital of Ivanovo Oblast) and 269 kilometres (167 mi) from Moscow. Ternevo is the nearest rural locality.
