= Menshchikovo =

Menshchikovo Меньщиково
- Village
- Location within Ivanovo Oblast Location within Russia
- Coordinates: 56°54′N 41°38′E
- Country: Russia
- Region: Ivanovo Oblast
- District: Shuysky District
- Time zone: UTC+3:00

Menshchikovo (Russian: Меньщиково) is a rural locality (a village) in Shuysky District, Ivanovo Oblast, Russia. Population: 37 (2010 census);

== Geography ==
This rural locality is located 16 kilometres (9.9 mi) from Shuya (the district's administrative centre), 42 kilometres (26 mi) from Ivanovo (capital of Ivanovo Oblast) and 275 kilometres (171 mi) from Moscow. Letnevo is the nearest rural locality.
