= Koshcheyevo, Shuysky District =

Koshcheyevo Кощеево
- Village
- Location within Ivanovo Oblast Location within Russia
- Coordinates: 56°56′N 41°22′E
- Country: Russia
- Region: Ivanovo Oblast
- District: Shuysky District
- Time zone: UTC+3:00

Koshcheyevo (Russian: Кощеево) is a rural locality (a village) in Shuysky District, Ivanovo Oblast, Russia. Population: 12 (2010 census);

== Geography ==
This rural locality is located 9 kilometres (5.6 mi) from Shuya (the district's administrative centre), 26 kilometres (16 mi) from Ivanovo (capital of Ivanovo Oblast) and 263 kilometres (163 mi) from Moscow. Fedorkovo is the nearest rural locality.
