= Ivantsevo, Shuysky District =

Ivantsevo Иванцево
- Village
- Location within Ivanovo Oblast Location within Russia
- Coordinates: 56°51′N 41°27′E
- Country: Russia
- Region: Ivanovo Oblast
- District: Shuysky District
- Time zone: UTC+3:00

Ivantsevo (Russian: Иванцево) is a rural locality (a village) in Shuysky District, Ivanovo Oblast, Russia. Population: 118 (2010 census);

== Geography ==
This rural locality is located 5 kilometres (3.1 mi) from Shuya (the district's administrative centre), 33 kilometres (21 mi) from Ivanovo (capital of Ivanovo Oblast) and 264 kilometres (164 mi) from Moscow. Litvintsevo is the nearest rural locality.
