= Vikhrevo =

Vikhrevo Вихрево
- Village
- Location within Ivanovo Oblast Location within Russia
- Coordinates: 56°53′N 41°34′E
- Country: Russia
- Region: Ivanovo Oblast
- District: Shuysky District
- Time zone: UTC+3:00

Vikhrevo (Russian: Вихрево) is a rural locality (a village) in Shuysky District, Ivanovo Oblast, Russia. Population: 12 (2010 census);

== Geography ==
This rural locality is located 12 kilometres (7.5 mi) from Shuya (the district's administrative centre), 39 kilometres (24 mi) from Ivanovo (capital of Ivanovo Oblast) and 271 kilometres (168 mi) from Moscow. Teplyakovo is the nearest rural locality.
