= Seberna =

Seberna Себерна
- Village
- Location within Ivanovo Oblast Location within Russia
- Coordinates: 56°44′N 41°25′E
- Country: Russia
- Region: Ivanovo Oblast
- District: Shuysky District
- Time zone: UTC+3:00

Seberna (Russian: Себерна) is a rural locality (a village) in Shuysky District, Ivanovo Oblast, Russia. Population: 13 (2010 census);

== Geography ==
This rural locality is located 14 kilometres (8.7 mi) from Shuya (the district's administrative centre), 40 kilometres (25 mi) from Ivanovo (capital of Ivanovo Oblast) and 256 kilometres (159 mi) from Moscow. Vekino is the nearest rural locality.
