= Kharitonovo, Shuysky District =

Kharitonovo Харитоново
- Village
- Location within Ivanovo Oblast Location within Russia
- Coordinates: 56°47′N 41°35′E
- Country: Russia
- Region: Ivanovo Oblast
- District: Shuysky District
- Time zone: UTC+3:00

Kharitonovo (Russian: Харитоново) is a rural locality (a village) in Shuysky District, Ivanovo Oblast, Russia. Population: 241 (2010 census);

== Geography ==
This rural locality is located 14 kilometres (8.7 mi) from Shuya (the district's administrative centre), 44 kilometres (27 mi) from Ivanovo (capital of Ivanovo Oblast) and 268 kilometres (167 mi) from Moscow. Plekhovo is the nearest rural locality.
