= Mikhalkovo, Shuysky District =

Mikhalkovo Михалково
- Village
- Location within Ivanovo Oblast Location within Russia
- Coordinates: 56°53′N 41°32′E
- Country: Russia
- Region: Ivanovo Oblast
- District: Shuysky District
- Time zone: UTC+3:00

Mikhalkovo (Russian: Михалково) is a rural locality (a village) in Shuysky District, Ivanovo Oblast, Russia. Population: 252 (2010 census);

== Geography ==
This rural locality is located 10 kilometres (6.2 mi) from Shuya (the district's administrative centre), 36 kilometres (22 mi) from Ivanovo (capital of Ivanovo Oblast) and 269 kilometres (167 mi) from Moscow. Aistovo is the nearest rural locality.
