= Chechkino-Bogorodskoye =

Chechkino-Bogorodskoye Чечкино-Богородское
- Village
- Location within Ivanovo Oblast Location within Russia
- Coordinates: 56°58′N 41°38′E
- Country: Russia
- Region: Ivanovo Oblast
- District: Shuysky District
- Time zone: UTC+3:00

Chechkino-Bogorodskoye (Russian: Чечкино-Богородское) is a rural locality (a selo) in Shuysky District, Ivanovo Oblast, Russia. Population: 93 (2010 census);

== Geography ==
This rural locality is located 21 kilometres (13 mi) from Shuya (the district's administrative centre), 41 kilometres (25 mi) from Ivanovo (capital of Ivanovo Oblast) and 279 kilometres (173 mi) from Moscow. Bludnitsino is the nearest rural locality.
