= Ostapovo =

Ostapovo Остапово
- Village
- Location within Ivanovo Oblast Location within Russia
- Coordinates: 56°49′N 41°24′E
- Country: Russia
- Region: Ivanovo Oblast
- District: Shuysky District
- Time zone: UTC+3:00

Ostapovo (Russian: Остапово) is a rural locality (a village) in Shuysky District, Ivanovo Oblast, Russia. Population: 809 (2010 census);

== Geography ==
This rural locality is located 3 kilometres (1.9 mi) from Shuya (the district's administrative centre), 32 kilometres (20 mi) from Ivanovo (capital of Ivanovo Oblast) and 259 kilometres (161 mi) from Moscow. Kameshkovo is the nearest rural locality.
