= Gari, Shuysky District =

Gari Гари
- Village
- Location within Ivanovo Oblast Location within Russia
- Coordinates: 56°51′N 41°37′E
- Country: Russia
- Region: Ivanovo Oblast
- District: Shuysky District
- Time zone: UTC+3:00

Gari (Russian: Гари) is a rural locality (a village) in Shuysky District, Ivanovo Oblast, Russia. Population: 5 (2010 census);

== Geography ==
This rural locality is located 15 kilometres (9.3 mi) from Shuya (the district's administrative centre), 43 kilometres (27 mi) from Ivanovo (capital of Ivanovo Oblast) and 273 kilometres (170 mi) from Moscow. Kolobovo is the nearest rural locality.
