= Styazhkovo =

Styazhkovo Стяжково
- Village
- Location within Ivanovo Oblast Location within Russia
- Coordinates: 56°52′N 41°22′E
- Country: Russia
- Region: Ivanovo Oblast
- District: Shuysky District
- Time zone: UTC+3:00

Styazhkovo (Russian: Стяжково) is a rural locality (a village) in Shuysky District, Ivanovo Oblast, Russia. Population: 15 (2010 census);

== Geography ==
This rural locality is located 3 kilometres (1.9 mi) from Shuya (the district's administrative centre), 28 kilometres (17 mi) from Ivanovo (capital of Ivanovo Oblast) and 260 kilometres (160 mi) from Moscow. Priliv is the nearest rural locality.
