= Panteleyevo, Shuysky District, Ivanovo Oblast =

Panteleyevo Пантелеево
- Village
- Location within Ivanovo Oblast Location within Russia
- Coordinates: 56°56′N 41°25′E
- Country: Russia
- Region: Ivanovo Oblast
- District: Shuysky District
- Time zone: UTC+3:00

Panteleyevo (Russian: Пантелеево) is a rural locality (a village) in Shuysky District, Ivanovo Oblast, Russia. Population: 5 (2010 census);

== Geography ==
This rural locality is located 10 kilometres (6.2 mi) from Shuya (the district's administrative centre), 28 kilometres (17 mi) from Ivanovo (capital of Ivanovo Oblast) and 266 kilometres (165 mi) from Moscow. Ozerkovo is the nearest rural locality.
