= Priliv =

Priliv Прилив
- Village
- Location within Ivanovo Oblast Location within Russia
- Coordinates: 56°52′N 41°24′E
- Country: Russia
- Region: Ivanovo Oblast
- District: Shuysky District
- Time zone: UTC+3:00

Priliv (Russian: Прилив) is a rural locality (a village) in Shuysky District, Ivanovo Oblast, Russia. Population: 502 (2010 census);

== Geography ==
This rural locality is located 3 kilometres (1.9 mi) from Shuya (the district's administrative centre), 29 kilometres (18 mi) from Ivanovo (capital of Ivanovo Oblast) and 262 kilometres (163 mi) from Moscow. Peremilovo is the nearest rural locality.
