= Dorozhayevo =

Dorozhayevo Дорожаево
- Village
- Location within Ivanovo Oblast Location within Russia
- Coordinates: 56°40′N 41°29′E
- Country: Russia
- Region: Ivanovo Oblast
- District: Shuysky District
- Time zone: UTC+3:00

Dorozhayevo (Russian: Дорожаево) is a rural locality (a selo) in Shuysky District, Ivanovo Oblast, Russia. Population: 76 (2010 census);

== Geography ==
This rural locality is located 20 kilometres (12 mi) from Shuya (the district's administrative centre), 47 kilometres (29 mi) from Ivanovo (capital of Ivanovo Oblast) and 257 kilometres (160 mi) from Moscow. Senino is the nearest rural locality.
