= Odintsovo (inhabited locality) =

Odintsovo (Russian: Одинцово) is the name of several inhabited localities in Russia.

Urban localities

- Odintsovo, a city in Odintsovsky District of Moscow Oblast

Rural localities

- Odintsovo, Ivanovo Oblast, a village in Shuysky District of Ivanovo Oblast
- Odintsovo, Kostroma Oblast, a village in Povalikhinskoye Settlement of Chukhlomsky District of Kostroma Oblast
- Odintsovo, Domodedovo, Moscow Oblast, a village under the administrative jurisdiction of the Domodedovo City Under Oblast Jurisdiction, Moscow Oblast
- Odintsovo, Nizhny Novgorod Oblast, a village in Luzhaysky Selsoviet of Shakhunya, Nizhny Novgorod Oblast
- Odintsovo, Pestovsky District, Novgorod Oblast, a village in Bogoslovskoye Settlement of Pestovsky District of Novgorod Oblast
- Odintsovo, Poddorsky District, Novgorod Oblast, a village in Poddorskoye Settlement of Poddorsky District of Novgorod Oblast
- Odintsovo, Perm Krai, a village in Karagaysky District of Perm Krai
- Odintsovo, Tyoplo-Ogaryovsky District, Tula Oblast, a village in Ivanovsky Rural Okrug of Tyoplo-Ogaryovsky District of Tula Oblast
- Odintsovo, Yasnogorsky District, Tula Oblast, a selo in Pervomayskaya Rural Territory of Yasnogorsky District of Tula Oblast
- Odintsovo, Kimrsky District, Tver Oblast, a village in Kimrsky District, Tver Oblast
- Odintsovo, Sonkovsky District, Tver Oblast, a village in Sonkovsky District, Tver Oblast
- Odintsovo, Vladimir Oblast, a village in Sudogodsky District of Vladimir Oblast
