= Markovo, Shuysky District =

Markovo Марково
- Village
- Location within Ivanovo Oblast Location within Russia
- Coordinates: 56°47′N 41°21′E
- Country: Russia
- Region: Ivanovo Oblast
- District: Shuysky District
- Time zone: UTC+3:00

Markovo (Russian: Марково) is a rural locality (a village) in Shuysky District, Ivanovo Oblast, Russia. Population: 14 (2010 census);

== Geography ==
This rural locality is located 7 kilometres (4.3 mi) from Shuya (the district's administrative centre), 32 kilometres (20 mi) from Ivanovo (capital of Ivanovo Oblast) and 255 kilometres (158 mi) from Moscow. Kosyachevo is the nearest rural locality.
