= Ivonino, Ivanovo Oblast =

Ivonino Ивонино
- Village
- Location within Ivanovo Oblast Location within Russia
- Coordinates: 56°56′N 41°30′E
- Country: Russia
- Region: Ivanovo Oblast
- District: Shuysky District
- Time zone: UTC+3:00

Ivonino (Russian: Ивонино) is a rural locality (a village) in Shuysky District, Ivanovo Oblast, Russia. Population: 29 (2010 census);

== Geography ==
This rural locality is located 12 kilometres (7.5 mi) from Shuya (the district's administrative centre), 34 kilometres (21 mi) from Ivanovo (capital of Ivanovo Oblast) and 270 kilometres (170 mi) from Moscow. Nikulnikovo is the nearest rural locality.
