= Aistovo =

Aistovo Аистово
- Village
- Location within Ivanovo Oblast Location within Russia
- Coordinates: 56°53′N 41°32′E
- Country: Russia
- Region: Ivanovo Oblast
- District: Shuysky District
- Time zone: UTC+3:00

Aistovo (Russian: Аистово) is a rural locality (a village) in Shuysky District, Ivanovo Oblast, Russia. Population: 42 (2010 census);

== Geography ==
This rural locality is located 11 kilometres (6.8 mi) from Shuya (the district's administrative centre), 36 kilometres (22 mi) from Ivanovo (capital of Ivanovo Oblast) and 270 kilometres (170 mi) from Moscow. Zhiznevo is the nearest rural locality.
