= Nikitinskoye =

Nikitinskoye Никитинское
- Village
- Location within Ivanovo Oblast Location within Russia
- Coordinates: 56°58′N 41°42′E
- Country: Russia
- Region: Ivanovo Oblast
- District: Shuysky District
- Time zone: UTC+3:00

Nikitinskoye (Russian: Никитинское) is a rural locality (a village) in Shuysky District, Ivanovo Oblast, Russia. Population: 95 (2010 census);

== Geography ==
This rural locality is located 23 kilometres (14 mi) from Shuya (the district's administrative centre), 45 kilometres (28 mi) from Ivanovo (capital of Ivanovo Oblast) and 282 kilometres (175 mi) from Moscow. Lazarevo is the nearest rural locality.
