= Kuznetsovo, Shuysky District =

Kuznetsovo Кузнецово
- Village
- Location within Ivanovo Oblast Location within Russia
- Coordinates: 56°53′N 41°30′E
- Country: Russia
- Region: Ivanovo Oblast
- District: Shuysky District
- Time zone: UTC+3:00

Kuznetsovo (Russian: Кузнецово) is a rural locality (a selo) in Shuysky District, Ivanovo Oblast, Russia. Population: 75 (2010 census);

== Geography ==
This rural locality is located 9 kilometres (5.6 mi) from Shuya (the district's administrative centre), 34 kilometres (21 mi) from Ivanovo (capital of Ivanovo Oblast) and 268 kilometres (167 mi) from Moscow. Mikhalkovo is the nearest rural locality.
