= Sevastyanovo, Ivanovo Oblast =

Sevastyanovo Севастьяново
- Village
- Location within Ivanovo Oblast Location within Russia
- Coordinates: 56°48′N 41°32′E
- Country: Russia
- Region: Ivanovo Oblast
- District: Shuysky District
- Time zone: UTC+3:00

Sevastyanovo (Russian: Севастьяново) is a rural locality (a village) in Shuysky District, Ivanovo Oblast, Russia. Population: 13 (2010 census);

== Geography ==
This rural locality is located 11 kilometres (6.8 mi) from Shuya (the district's administrative centre), 40 kilometres (25 mi) from Ivanovo (capital of Ivanovo Oblast) and 266 kilometres (165 mi) from Moscow. Maksimikha is the nearest rural locality.
