= Kosyachevo =

Kosyachevo Косячево
- Village
- Location within Ivanovo Oblast Location within Russia
- Coordinates: 56°48′N 41°22′E
- Country: Russia
- Region: Ivanovo Oblast
- District: Shuysky District
- Time zone: UTC+3:00

Kosyachevo (Russian: Косячево) is a rural locality (a village) in Shuysky District, Ivanovo Oblast, Russia. Population: 10 (2010 census);

== Geography ==
This rural locality is located 6 kilometres (3.7 mi) from Shuya (the district's administrative centre), 32 kilometres (20 mi) from Ivanovo (capital of Ivanovo Oblast) and 256 kilometres (159 mi) from Moscow. Markovo is the nearest rural locality.
