= Fedotovo, Shuysky District =

Fedotovo Федотово
- Village
- Location within Ivanovo Oblast Location within Russia
- Coordinates: 56°46′N 41°19′E
- Country: Russia
- Region: Ivanovo Oblast
- District: Shuysky District
- Time zone: UTC+3:00

Fedotovo (Russian: Федотово) is a rural locality (a village) in Shuysky District, Ivanovo Oblast, Russia. Population: 7 (2010 census);

== Geography ==
This rural locality is located 10 kilometres (6.2 mi) from Shuya (the district's administrative centre), 33 kilometres (21 mi) from Ivanovo (capital of Ivanovo Oblast) and 252 kilometres (157 mi) from Moscow. Vasilevo is the nearest rural locality.
