= Zatkhlino =

Zatkhlino Затхлино
- Village
- Location within Ivanovo Oblast Location within Russia
- Coordinates: 56°40′N 41°22′E
- Country: Russia
- Region: Ivanovo Oblast
- District: Shuysky District
- Time zone: UTC+3:00

Zatkhlino (Russian: Затхлино) is a rural locality (a village) in Shuysky District, Ivanovo Oblast, Russia. Population: 6 (2010 census);

== Geography ==
This rural locality is located 20 kilometres (12 mi) from Shuya (the district's administrative centre), 44 kilometres (27 mi) from Ivanovo (capital of Ivanovo Oblast) and 251 kilometres (156 mi) from Moscow. Aristikha is the nearest rural locality.
