= Peremilovo, Shuysky District =

Peremilovo Перемилово
- Village
- Location within Ivanovo Oblast Location within Russia
- Coordinates: 56°53′N 41°24′E
- Country: Russia
- Region: Ivanovo Oblast
- District: Shuysky District
- Time zone: UTC+3:00

Peremilovo (Russian: Перемилово) is a rural locality (a village) in Shuysky District, Ivanovo Oblast, Russia. Population: 452 (2010 census);

== Geography ==
This rural locality is located 4 kilometres (2.5 mi) from Shuya (the district's administrative centre), 29 kilometres (18 mi) from Ivanovo (capital of Ivanovo Oblast) and 262 kilometres (163 mi) from Moscow. Priliv is the nearest rural locality.
