= Perevesnovo =

Perevesnovo Перевесново
- Village
- Location within Ivanovo Oblast Location within Russia
- Coordinates: 56°41′N 41°35′E
- Country: Russia
- Region: Ivanovo Oblast
- District: Shuysky District
- Time zone: UTC+3:00

Perevesnovo (Russian: Перевесново) is a rural locality (a village) in Shuysky District, Ivanovo Oblast, Russia. Population: 35 (2010 census);

== Geography ==
This rural locality is located 21 kilometres (13 mi) from Shuya (the district's administrative centre), 50 kilometres (31 mi) from Ivanovo (capital of Ivanovo Oblast) and 264 kilometres (164 mi) from Moscow. Krapivnovo is the nearest rural locality.
