= Milyukovka =

Milyukovka Милюковка
- Village
- Location within Ivanovo Oblast Location within Russia
- Coordinates: 56°47′N 41°29′E
- Country: Russia
- Region: Ivanovo Oblast
- District: Shuysky District
- Time zone: UTC+3:00

Milyukovka (Russian: Милюковка) is a rural locality (a village) in Shuysky District, Ivanovo Oblast, Russia. Population: 331 (2010 census);

== Geography ==
This rural locality is located 9 kilometres (5.6 mi) from Shuya (the district's administrative centre), 38 kilometres (24 mi) from Ivanovo (capital of Ivanovo Oblast) and 262 kilometres (163 mi) from Moscow. Parshigino is the nearest rural locality.
