= Lazarevo, Shuysky District =

Lazarevo Лазарево
- Village
- Location within Ivanovo Oblast Location within Russia
- Coordinates: 56°57′N 41°43′E
- Country: Russia
- Region: Ivanovo Oblast
- District: Shuysky District
- Time zone: UTC+3:00

Lazarevo (Russian: Лазарево) is a rural locality (a village) in Shuysky District, Ivanovo Oblast, Russia. Population: 13 (2010 census);

== Geography ==
This rural locality is located 24 kilometres (15 mi) from Shuya (the district's administrative centre), 46 kilometres (29 mi) from Ivanovo (capital of Ivanovo Oblast) and 283 kilometres (176 mi) from Moscow. Repino is the nearest rural locality.
