= Kachalovo, Ivanovo Oblast =

Kachalovo Качалово
- Village
- Location within Ivanovo Oblast Location within Russia
- Coordinates: 56°56′N 41°26′E
- Country: Russia
- Region: Ivanovo Oblast
- District: Shuysky District
- Time zone: UTC+3:00

Kachalovo (Russian: Качалово) is a rural locality (a village) in Shuysky District, Ivanovo Oblast, Russia. Population: 331 (2010 census);

== Geography ==
This rural locality is located 11 kilometres (6.8 mi) from Shuya (the district's administrative centre), 29 kilometres (18 mi) from Ivanovo (capital of Ivanovo Oblast) and 267 kilometres (166 mi) from Moscow. Voronezh is the nearest rural locality.
