= Klochkovo =

Klochkovo Клочково
- Village
- Location within Ivanovo Oblast Location within Russia
- Coordinates: 56°43′N 41°31′E
- Country: Russia
- Region: Ivanovo Oblast
- District: Shuysky District
- Time zone: UTC+3:00

Klochkovo (Russian: Клочково) is a rural locality (a village) in Shuysky District, Ivanovo Oblast, Russia. Population: 332 (2010 census);

== Geography ==
This rural locality is located 17 kilometres (11 mi) from Shuya (the district's administrative centre), 46 kilometres (29 mi) from Ivanovo (capital of Ivanovo Oblast) and 261 kilometres (162 mi) from Moscow. Yakushevo is the nearest rural locality.
