= Zaprudnovo, Shuysky District =

Zaprudnovo Запрудново
- Village
- Location within Ivanovo Oblast Location within Russia
- Coordinates: 56°42′N 41°16′E
- Country: Russia
- Region: Ivanovo Oblast
- District: Shuysky District
- Time zone: UTC+3:00

Zaprudnovo (Russian: Запрудново) is a rural locality (a village) in Shuysky District, Ivanovo Oblast, Russia. Population: 18 (2010 census);

== Geography ==
This rural locality is located 17 kilometres (11 mi) from Shuya (the district's administrative centre), 36 kilometres (22 mi) from Ivanovo (capital of Ivanovo Oblast) and 247 kilometres (153 mi) from Moscow. Kokoshkino is the nearest rural locality.
