= Kameshkovo =

Kameshkovo (Russian: Камешково) is the name of several inhabited localities in Russia.

Urban localities

- Kameshkovo, Vladimir Oblast, a town in Kameshkovsky District of Vladimir Oblast

Rural localities

- Kameshkovo, Lukhsky District, Ivanovo Oblast, a village in Lukhsky District, Ivanovo Oblast
- Kameshkovo, Shuysky District, Ivanovo Oblast, a village in Shuysky District, Ivanovo Oblast
- Kameshkovo, Yaroslavl Oblast, a village in Neverkovsky Rural Okrug of Borisoglebsky District of Yaroslavl Oblast
