= Chizhovo, Ivanovo Oblast =

Chizhovo Чижово
- Village
- Location within Ivanovo Oblast Location within Russia
- Coordinates: 56°53′N 41°28′E
- Country: Russia
- Region: Ivanovo Oblast
- District: Shuysky District
- Time zone: UTC+3:00

Chizhovo (Russian: Чижово) is a rural locality (a village) in Shuysky District, Ivanovo Oblast, Russia. Population: 276 (2010 census);

== Geography ==
This rural locality is located 7 kilometres (4.3 mi) from Shuya (the district's administrative centre), 33 kilometres (21 mi) from Ivanovo (capital of Ivanovo Oblast) and 266 kilometres (165 mi) from Moscow. Lavrovo is the nearest rural locality.
