= Rusilovo =

Rusilovo Русилово
- Village
- Location within Ivanovo Oblast Location within Russia
- Coordinates: 56°48′N 41°13′E
- Country: Russia
- Region: Ivanovo Oblast
- District: Shuysky District
- Time zone: UTC+3:00

Rusilovo (Russian: Русилово) is a rural locality (a village) in Shuysky District, Ivanovo Oblast, Russia. Population: 25 (2010 census);

== Geography ==
This rural locality is located 11 kilometres (6.8 mi) from Shuya (the district's administrative centre), 26 kilometres (16 mi) from Ivanovo (capital of Ivanovo Oblast) and 248 kilometres (154 mi) from Moscow. Palkino is the nearest rural locality.
