= Arefino, Shuysky District =

Arefino Арефино
- Village
- Location within Ivanovo Oblast Location within Russia
- Coordinates: 56°49′N 41°32′E
- Country: Russia
- Region: Ivanovo Oblast
- District: Shuysky District
- Time zone: UTC+3:00

Arefino (Russian: Арефино) is a rural locality (a village) in Shuysky District, Ivanovo Oblast, Russia. Population: 234 (2010 census);

== Geography ==
This rural locality is located 9 kilometres (5.6 mi) from Shuya (the district's administrative centre), 39 kilometres (24 mi) from Ivanovo (capital of Ivanovo Oblast) and 266 kilometres (165 mi) from Moscow. Filatovka is the nearest rural locality.
