= Dunilovo, Ivanovo Oblast =

Dunilovo Дунилово
- Village
- Location within Ivanovo Oblast Location within Russia
- Coordinates: 56°59′N 41°24′E
- Country: Russia
- Region: Ivanovo Oblast
- District: Shuysky District
- Time zone: UTC+3:00

Dunilovo (Russian: Дунилово) is a rural locality (a village) in Shuysky District, Ivanovo Oblast, Russia. Population: 581 (2010 census);

== Geography ==
This rural locality is located 16 kilometres (9.9 mi) from Shuya (the district's administrative centre), 27 kilometres (17 mi) from Ivanovo (capital of Ivanovo Oblast) and 268 kilometres (167 mi) from Moscow. Goritsy is the nearest rural locality.
