= Trutnevo, Ivanovo Oblast =

Trutnevo Трутнево
- Village
- Location within Ivanovo Oblast Location within Russia
- Coordinates: 56°49′N 41°17′E
- Country: Russia
- Region: Ivanovo Oblast
- District: Shuysky District
- Time zone: UTC+3:00

Trutnevo (Russian: Трутнево) is a rural locality (a village) in Shuysky District, Ivanovo Oblast, Russia. Population: 54 (2010 census);

== Geography ==
This rural locality is located 6 kilometres (3.7 mi) from Shuya (the district's administrative centre), 27 kilometres (17 mi) from Ivanovo (capital of Ivanovo Oblast) and 253 kilometres (157 mi) from Moscow. Yurkino is the nearest rural locality.
