= Yakimanna =

Yakimanna Якиманна
- Village
- Location within Ivanovo Oblast Location within Russia
- Coordinates: 56°47′N 41°16′E
- Country: Russia
- Region: Ivanovo Oblast
- District: Shuysky District
- Time zone: UTC+3:00

Yakimanna (Russian: Якиманна) is a rural locality (a village) in Shuysky District, Ivanovo Oblast, Russia. Population: 27 (2010 census);

== Geography ==
This rural locality is located 9 kilometres (5.6 mi) from Shuya (the district's administrative centre), 28 kilometres (17 mi) from Ivanovo (capital of Ivanovo Oblast) and 251 kilometres (156 mi) from Moscow. Gumnishchi is the nearest rural locality.
