= Isakovo, Shuysky District =

Isakovo Исаково
- Village
- Location within Ivanovo Oblast Location within Russia
- Coordinates: 56°40′N 41°32′E
- Country: Russia
- Region: Ivanovo Oblast
- District: Shuysky District
- Time zone: UTC+3:00

Isakovo (Russian: Исаково) is a rural locality (a village) in Shuysky District, Ivanovo Oblast, Russia. Population: 60 (2010 census);

== Geography ==
This rural locality is located 22 kilometres (14 mi) from Shuya (the district's administrative centre), 50 kilometres (31 mi) from Ivanovo (capital of Ivanovo Oblast) and 260 kilometres (160 mi) from Moscow. Aristovo is the nearest rural locality.
