= Teplyakovo =

Teplyakovo Тепляково
- Village
- Location within Ivanovo Oblast Location within Russia
- Coordinates: 56°52′N 41°35′E
- Country: Russia
- Region: Ivanovo Oblast
- District: Shuysky District
- Time zone: UTC+3:00

Teplyakovo (Russian: Тепляково) is a rural locality (a village) in Shuysky District, Ivanovo Oblast, Russia. Population: 78 (2010 census);

== Geography ==
This rural locality is located 13 kilometres (8.1 mi) from Shuya (the district's administrative centre), 40 kilometres (25 mi) from Ivanovo (capital of Ivanovo Oblast) and 271 kilometres (168 mi) from Moscow. Markovo is the nearest rural locality.
