= Serednevo Bolshoye =

Serednevo Bolshoye Середнево Большое
- Village
- Location within Ivanovo Oblast Location within Russia
- Coordinates: 56°55′N 41°37′E
- Country: Russia
- Region: Ivanovo Oblast
- District: Shuysky District
- Time zone: UTC+3:00

Serednevo Bolshoye (Russian: Середнево Большое) is a rural locality (a village) in Shuysky District, Ivanovo Oblast, Russia. Population: 16 (2010 census);

== Geography ==
This rural locality is located 17 kilometres (11 mi) from Shuya (the district's administrative centre), 40 kilometres (25 mi) from Ivanovo (capital of Ivanovo Oblast) and 276 kilometres (171 mi) from Moscow. Motovo is the nearest rural locality.
