= Litvintsevo =

Litvintsevo Литвинцево
- Village
- Location within Ivanovo Oblast Location within Russia
- Coordinates: 56°52′N 41°28′E
- Country: Russia
- Region: Ivanovo Oblast
- District: Shuysky District
- Time zone: UTC+3:00

Litvintsevo (Russian: Литвинцево) is a rural locality (a village) in Shuysky District, Ivanovo Oblast, Russia. Population: 29 (2010 census);

== Geography ==
This rural locality is located 6 kilometres (3.7 mi) from Shuya (the district's administrative centre), 34 kilometres (21 mi) from Ivanovo (capital of Ivanovo Oblast) and 265 kilometres (165 mi) from Moscow. Ivantsevo is the nearest rural locality.
