= Studentsy =

Studentsy Студенцы
- Village
- Location within Ivanovo Oblast Location within Russia
- Coordinates: 56°44′N 41°17′E
- Country: Russia
- Region: Ivanovo Oblast
- District: Shuysky District
- Time zone: UTC+3:00

Studentsy (Russian: Студенцы) is a rural locality (a village) in Shuysky District, Ivanovo Oblast, Russia. Population: 27 (2010 census);

== Geography ==
This rural locality is located 14 kilometres (8.7 mi) from Shuya (the district's administrative centre), 35 kilometres (22 mi) from Ivanovo (capital of Ivanovo Oblast) and 250 kilometres (160 mi) from Moscow. Ladygino is the nearest rural locality.
