= Gnezdilovo, Ivanovo Oblast =

Gnezdilovo Гнездилово
- Village
- Location within Ivanovo Oblast Location within Russia
- Coordinates: 56°44′N 41°12′E
- Country: Russia
- Region: Ivanovo Oblast
- District: Shuysky District
- Time zone: UTC+3:00

Gnezdilovo (Russian: Гнездилово) is a rural locality (a village) in Shuysky District, Ivanovo Oblast, Russia. Population: 151 (2010 census);

== Geography ==
This rural locality is located 17 kilometres (11 mi) from Shuya (the district's administrative centre), 32 kilometres (20 mi) from Ivanovo (capital of Ivanovo Oblast) and 245 kilometres (152 mi) from Moscow. Mikhalevo is the nearest rural locality.
