= Aristovo, Shuysky District =

Aristovo Аристово
- Village
- Location within Ivanovo Oblast Location within Russia
- Coordinates: 56°40′N 41°33′E
- Country: Russia
- Region: Ivanovo Oblast
- District: Shuysky District
- Time zone: UTC+3:00

Aristovo (Russian: Аристово) is a rural locality (a village) in Shuysky District, Ivanovo Oblast, Russia. Population: 41 (2010 census);

== Geography ==
This rural locality is located 22 kilometres (14 mi) from Shuya (the district's administrative centre), 50 kilometres (31 mi) from Ivanovo (capital of Ivanovo Oblast) and 261 kilometres (162 mi) from Moscow. Isakovo is the nearest rural locality.
