= Odintsovo, Ivanovo Oblast =

Odintsovo Одинцово
- Village
- Location within Ivanovo Oblast Location within Russia
- Coordinates: 56°53′N 41°24′E
- Country: Russia
- Region: Ivanovo Oblast
- District: Shuysky District
- Time zone: UTC+3:00

Odintsovo (Russian: Одинцово) is a rural locality (a village) in Shuysky District, Ivanovo Oblast, Russia. Population: 63 (2010 census);

== Geography ==
This rural locality is located 4 kilometres (2.5 mi) from Shuya (the district's administrative centre), 30 kilometres (19 mi) from Ivanovo (capital of Ivanovo Oblast) and 263 kilometres (163 mi) from Moscow. Peremilovo is the nearest rural locality.
