= Shartoma Monastery =

Coordinates: 56.96593°N 41.33833°E

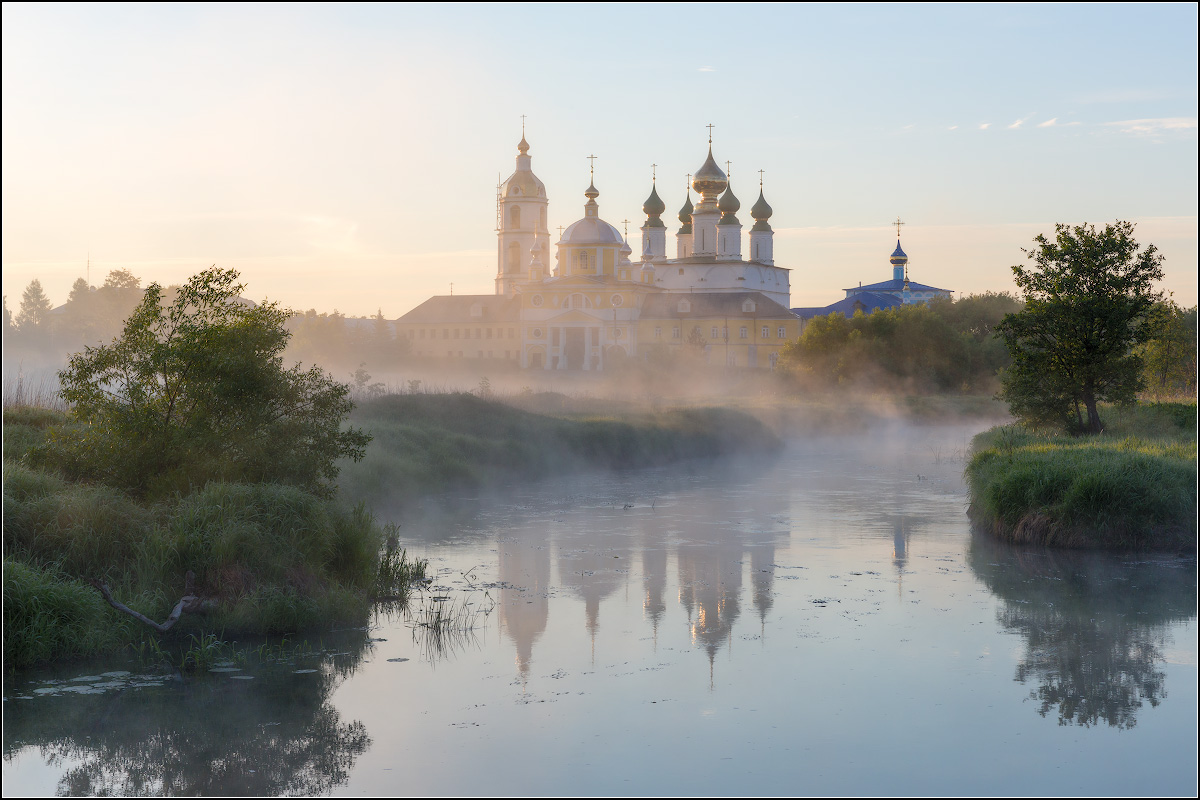
The monastery in the morning mist

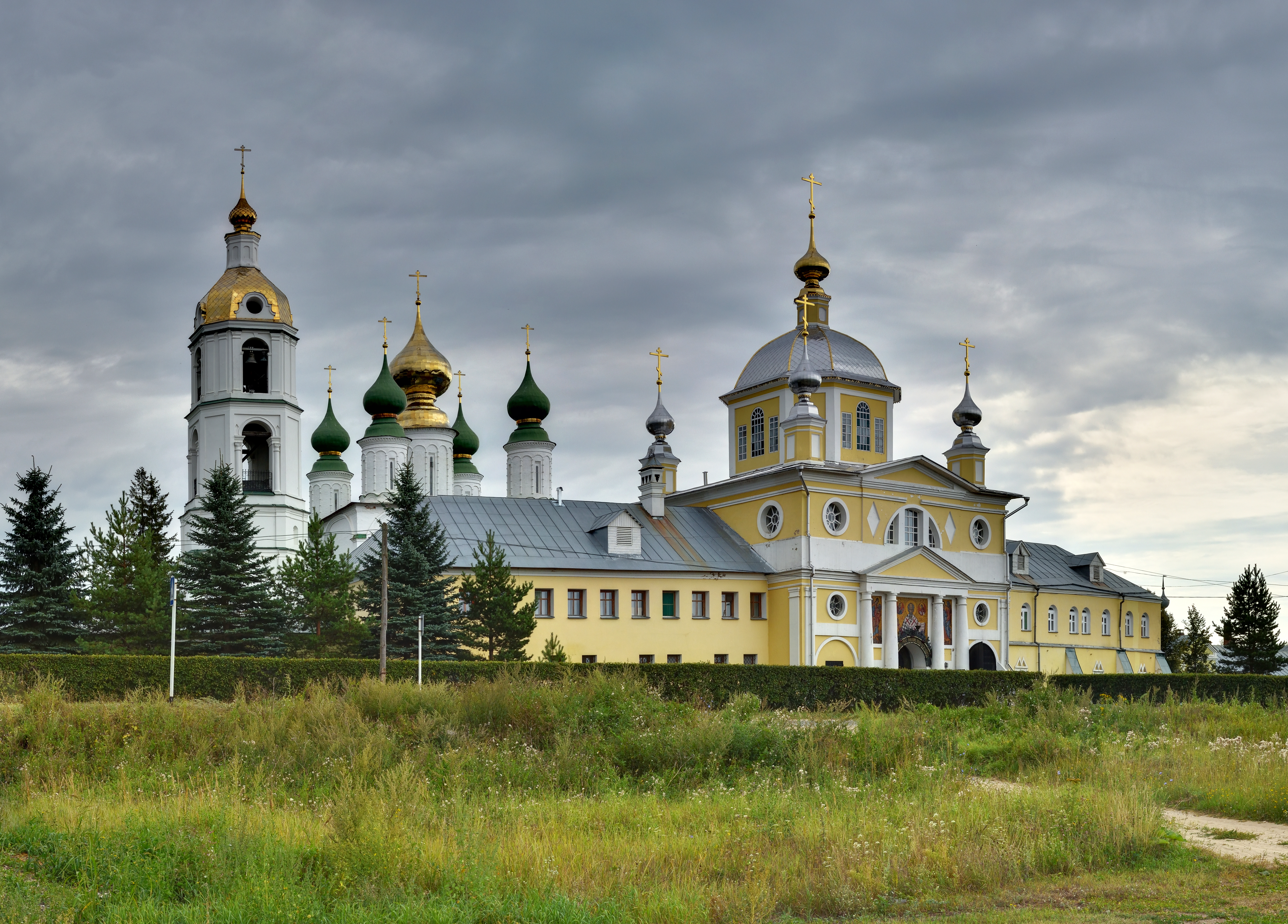
The churches in August 2018

The Shartoma Monastery of St. Nicholas (Николо-Шартомский монастырь, Nikolo-Shartomsky Monastery) is a Russian Orthodox monastery in the village of Vvedenyo near Shuya in the Ivanovo Region of Russia. It takes its name from the small Shartoma (or Shakhma) river. It is the largest monastery in the region.

The monastery has been known since the mid-15th century. It was looted by Poles in 1619 and ravaged by brigands in 1624. Work on the surviving five-domed katholikon (main church) began after a fire in 1645. At that time the monastery was transferred to its current location near the confluence of the Molokhta and Teza Rivers. The new location was so advantageous for trade that an annual fair sprang up near the monastery, attracting merchants from all over Zalesye and Upper Volga regions. The second surviving church was completed and consecrated in 1678.

Before Catherine II's secularisation reform, the Shartoma Monastery boasted a far-flung network of 9 filial monasteries. As a result of the reform, the monastery entered a period of decline, which gained momentum after the Nicholas fair had been discontinued. The Bolsheviks closed the monastery and gave the buildings to a local collective farm. It was one of the first monasteries revived in the Soviet Union, as early as 1990. The crumbling buildings were repaired by more than 100 resident monks.

The Shartoma Monastery is one of the largest in the Russian Federation in terms of resident monks. It has served as the head office of the Shuya Eparchy since its establishment in 2013. It has filial churches in Ivanovo, Shuya, Yuryevets, and Palekh. It also operates a boys' orphanage in Ivanovo.
