= Teza (river) =

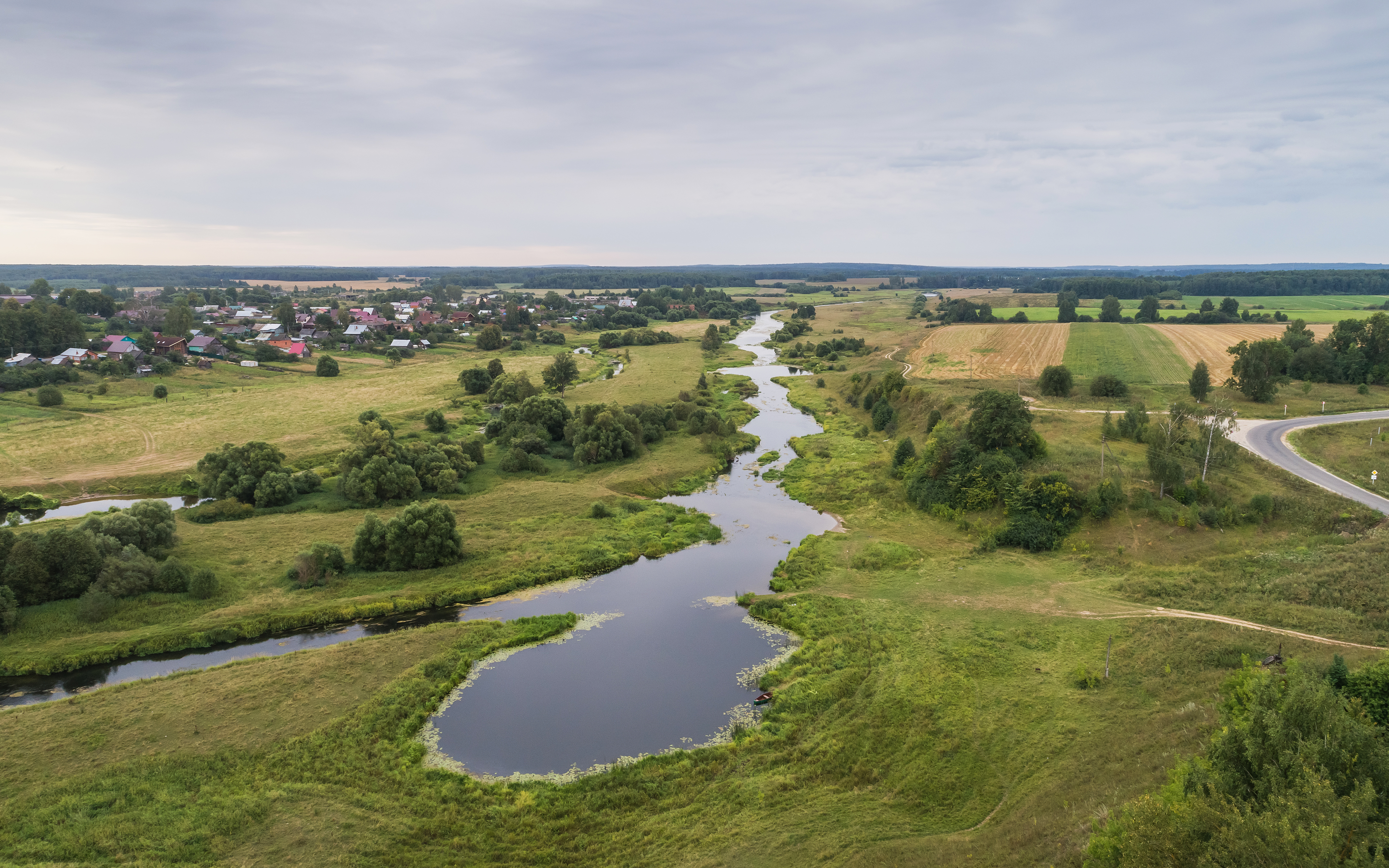
- Aerial view of Teza River near Shuya
- Native name: Теза (Russian)

Location
- Country: Russia

Physical characteristics
- Mouth: Klyazma
  - coordinates: 56.5206°N 41.9117°E
- Length: 192 km (119 mi)
- Basin size: 3,450 km^{2} (1,330 sq mi)

Basin features
- Progression: Klyazma→ Oka→ Volga→ Caspian Sea

The Teza (Russian: Те́за) is a river in Ivanovo Oblast, Russia. It is a left tributary of the Klyazma, which is in turn a tributary of the Oka. It has a length of 192 kilometers and a drainage basin with an area of 3,450 square kilometers. Annual flooding occurs between April and the middle of May. It freezes up between the beginning of November and the beginning of December and breaks up some time in April. The city of Shuya is located on the Teza.

The main tributaries of the Teza are Lulekh, Parsha, Molokhta, Nozyga, Postna.

The Teza valley was historically an important textile-industry region.
