= Shuya, Ivanovo Oblast =

Town in Ivanovo Oblast, Russia

Shuya Шуя
- Town
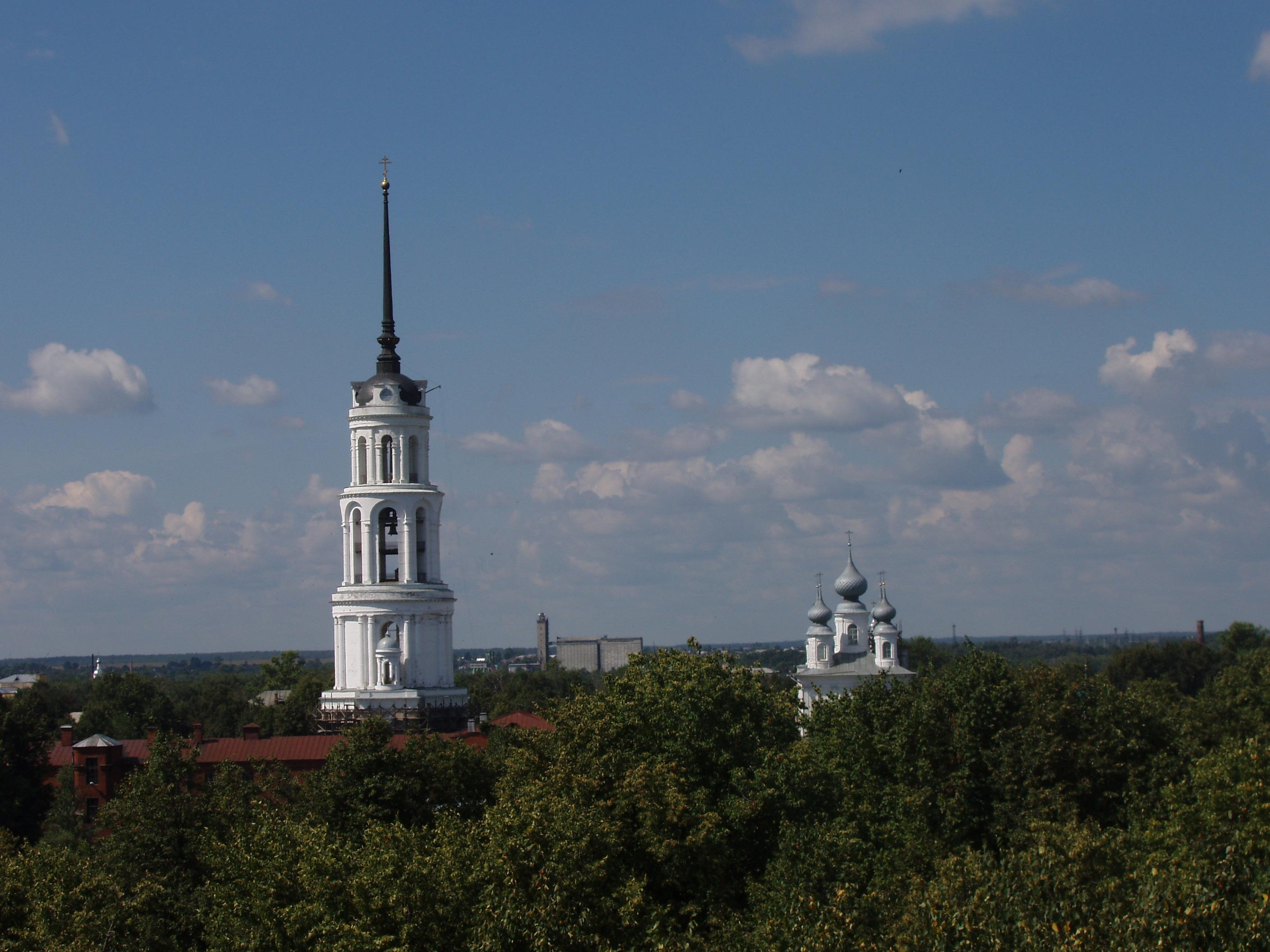
- Resurrection Cathedral and its bell tower in Shuya

- Flag Coat of arms
- Interactive map of Shuya
- Location of Shuya Shuya (Ivanovo Oblast)
- Coordinates: 56°51′00″N 41°22′00″E
- Country: Russia
- Federal subject: Ivanovo Oblast
- First mentioned: 1393
- Town status since: 1778

Government
  - Head: Natalya Koryagina (acting)

Area
  - Total: 33.29 km^{2} (12.85 sq mi)
- Elevation: 100 m (330 ft)

Population (2010 Census)
  - Total: 58,486
  - Estimate (2025): 52,971 (−9.4%)
  - Rank: 283rd in 2010
  - Density: 1,757/km^{2} (4,550/sq mi)

Administrative status
  - Subordinated to: Town of Shuya
  - Capital of: Shuysky District, Town of Shuya

Municipal status
  - Urban okrug: Shuya Urban Okrug
  - Capital of: Shuya Urban Okrug, Shuysky Municipal District
- Time zone: UTC+3 (MSK)
- Postal codes: 155900—155906, 155908, 155912
- Dialing code: +7 49351
- OKTMO ID: 24711000001
- Website: www.okrugshuya.ru

Shuya (Russian: Шу́я, pronounced [ˈʂujə]) is the third largest town in Ivanovo Oblast, Russia. The town is built on the high left bank of the navigable Teza river, a tributary of the Klyazma river, with two suburbs on the right bank. Population: 55,225 (2021 census); 58,486 (2010 census); 62,449 (2002 census); 69,362 (1989 Soviet census); 18,968 (in 1897); 19,560 (in 1882).

Shuya is one of the chief centers of the cotton and linen industries in central Russia.

== History ==
Central Market Place, 1890s

The first record of Shuya is dated 1393. Annalists mention princes of Shuya in 1403. Since 1403, the area was held by a branch of the House of Suzdal, which got their name "Shuysky" after the town. In 1539, the town was sacked by Safa Giray of Kazan. In 1566, it was taken by Ivan the Terrible as his personal property into Oprichnina.

In 1722, Shuya was visited by Peter the Great, who launched textile manufacturing there. The town's first linen manufacturers were established in 1755. Town status was granted to it in 1778. By the 19th century, Shuya was developed into a major flax-processing center, although it has been superseded in importance by the neighboring town of Ivanovo. Mikhail Frunze, a Soviet revolutionary, led textile workers in Shuya in a strike action during the Russian Revolution of 1905.

== Administrative and municipal status ==
Within the framework of administrative divisions, Shuya serves as the administrative center of Shuysky District, even though it is not a part of it. As an administrative division, it is incorporated separately as the Town of Shuya—an administrative unit with the status equal to that of the districts. As a municipal division, the Town of Shuya is incorporated as Shuya Urban Okrug.

== Architecture ==
Nikolo-Shartomsky Monastery, situated 12 kilometers (7.5 mi) from Shuya, has one of the largest monastic communities in Russia. It was first mentioned in 1425. It has a cathedral from 1652 and a refectory church from 1678.

The belltower of the Resurrection Cathedral in Shuya is the tallest freestanding bell tower in the world.

== Notable people ==
- Boris Balmont (1927–2022), Russian politician
- Konstantin Balmont (1867–1942), Russian poet
- Lev Bashmakov (1938–2018), Russian politician
- Pavel Belov (1897–1963), Soviet military commander
- Lyudmila Chernykh (1935–2017), Ukrainian-Russian-Soviet astronomer
- Vasily Luzhsky (1869–1931), Russian Soviet stage actor
- Feodor Vassilyev (c. 1707–1782), Russian father of 87 children
- Valentina Vassilyev (1707–1782), Russian prolific mother

== Economy ==
According to the 1911 Encyclopedia Britannica, tanneries, especially for the preparation of sheepskins—widely renowned throughout Russia—still maintain their importance, although this industry has migrated to a great extent to the country districts. The cathedral (1799) is a large building, with five gilt cupolas. Nearly every village in the vicinity has a specialty of its own—bricks, pottery, wheels, toys, packing-boxes, looms and other weaving implements, house furniture, sieves, combs, boots, gloves, felt goods, candles, and so on.

As of 1911, the manufacture of linen and cotton in the villages, as well as the preparation and manufacture of sheepskins and rough gloves, occupied about 40,000 peasants. The Shuya merchants carry on an active trade in these products all over Russia, and in corn, spirits, salt and other food stuffs, imported.

== International cooperation ==
Shuya is twinned with Istočna Ilidža, Bosnia and Herzegovina, since 2025.

== See also ==
- List of tallest Eastern Orthodox church buildings
- Shuysky
