= Shuysky District =

Shuysky District Шуйский район (Russian)
- District
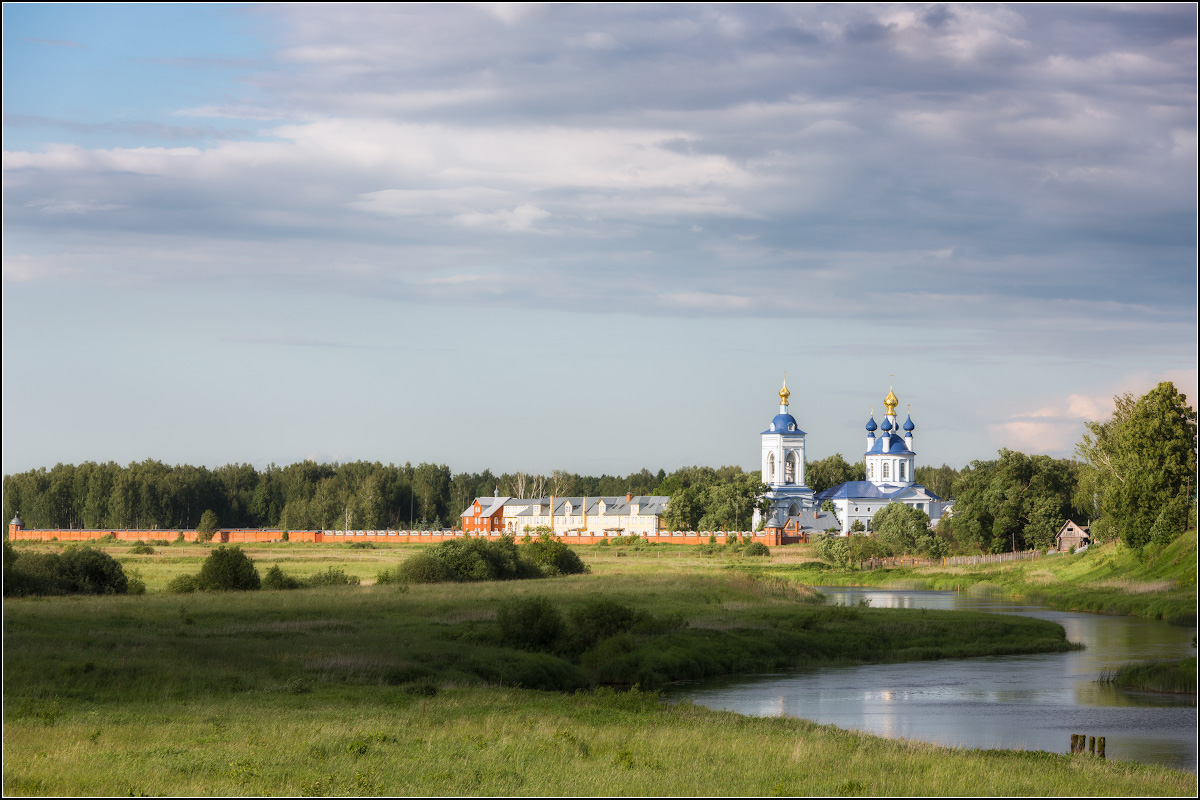
- Holy Assumption Convent, Shuysky District

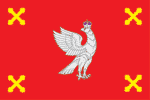
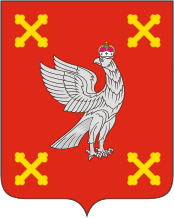
- Flag Coat of arms
- Location of Shuysky District in Ivanovo Oblast
- Coordinates: 56°51′N 41°22′E
- Country: Russia
- Federal subject: Ivanovo Oblast
- Administrative center: Shuya

Area
  - Total: 1,065 km^{2} (411 sq mi)

Population (2010 Census)
  - Total: 21,682
  - Density: 20.36/km^{2} (52.73/sq mi)
  - Urban: 11.3%
  - Rural: 88.7%

Administrative structure
  - Inhabited localities: 157 rural localities

Municipal structure
  - Municipally incorporated as: Shuysky Municipal District
  - Municipal divisions: 1 urban settlements, 7 rural settlements
- Time zone: UTC+3 (MSK)
- OKTMO ID: 24633000
- Website: http://www.adm-shr.ru/

Shuysky District (Russian: Шу́йский райо́н) is an administrative and municipal district (raion), one of the twenty-one in Ivanovo Oblast, Russia. It is located in the center of the oblast. The area of the district is 1,065 square kilometers (411 sq mi). Its administrative center is the town of Shuya (which is not administratively a part of the district). Population: 20,111 (2021 census); 21,682 (2010 census); 23,660 (2002 Census); 24,400 (1989 Soviet census).

== Administrative and municipal status ==
Within the framework of administrative divisions, Shuysky District is one of the twenty-one in the oblast. The town of Shuya serves as its administrative center, despite being incorporated separately as an administrative unit with the status equal to that of the districts.

As a municipal division, the district is incorporated as Shuysky Municipal District. The Town of Shuya is incorporated separately from the district as Shuya Urban Okrug.
