= Ivanovo Oblast =

First-level administrative division of Russia

Ivanovo Oblast Ивановская область (Russian)
- Oblast
- Flag Coat of arms

- Coordinates: 57°01′N 41°31′E
- Country: Russia
- Federal district: Central
- Economic region: Central
- Established: March 11, 1936
- Administrative center: Ivanovo

Government
  - Body: Oblast Duma
  - Governor: Stanislav Voskresensky

Area
  - Total: 21,437 km^{2} (8,277 sq mi)
  - Rank: 73rd

Population (2021 census)
  - Total: 927,828
  - Estimate (2018): 1,014,646
  - Rank: 55th
  - Density: 43.282/km^{2} (112.10/sq mi)
  - Urban: 81.9%
  - Rural: 18.1%

GDP (nominal, 2024)
  - Total: ₽503 billion (US$5.9 billion)
  - Per capita: ₽557,302 (US$6,539.49)
- Time zone: UTC+3 (MSK)
- ISO 3166 code: RU-IVA
- License plates: 37
- OKTMO ID: 24000000
- Official languages: Russian
- Website: http://www.ivanovoobl.ru

Ivanovo Oblast (Russian: Ива́новская о́бласть, romanized: Ivanovskaya oblastʹ) is a federal subject of Russia (an oblast). It had a population of 927,828 as of the 2021 Russian Census.

Its three largest cities are Ivanovo (the administrative center), Kineshma, and Shuya. The principal center of tourism is Plyos. The Volga River flows through the northern part of the oblast.

== History ==
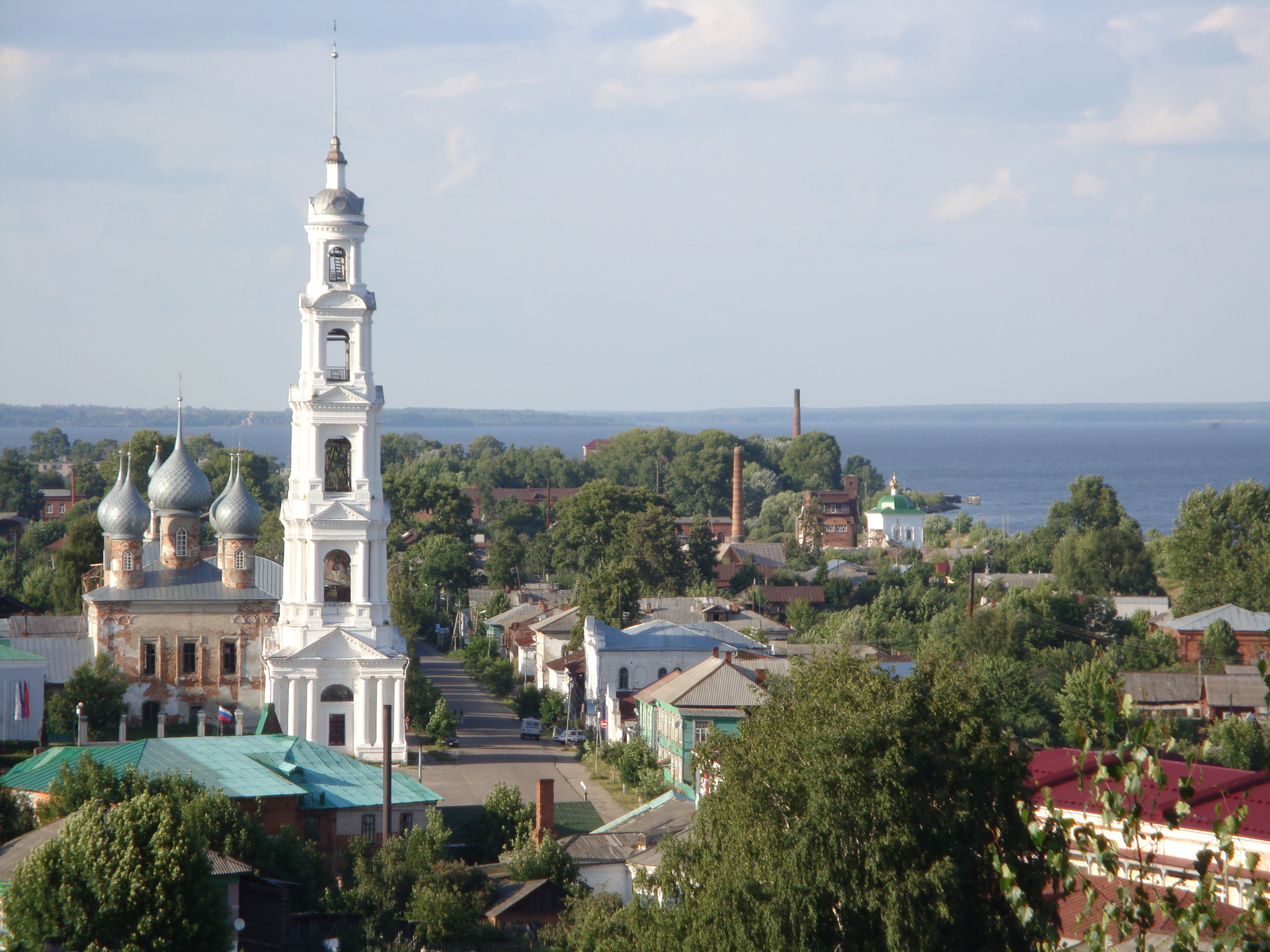
Yuryevets

Early in its history, the Ivanovo region was a melting pot between different populations like Russians, Europeans, Asians, and others. Various ancient Uralian and ancient Slavic tribes inhabited the area.

Ivanovo Industrial Oblast (Ива́новская промы́шленная о́бласть) was established on October 1, 1929. On March 11, 1936, a part of it became the modern Ivanovo Oblast while the remainder was split off to create Yaroslavl Oblast. On 21 May 1998 Ivanovo Oblast alongside Amur, Kostroma, Voronezh Oblasts, and the Mari El Republic signed a power-sharing agreement with the federal government, granting it autonomy. This agreement would be abolished on 26 February 2002.

== Geography ==
Ivanovo Oblast shares borders with Kostroma Oblast (N), Nizhny Novgorod Oblast (E), Vladimir Oblast (S), and Yaroslavl Oblast (W). The climate of Ivanovo Oblast is continental, with long, cold winters, and short, warm summers. The coldest month is January with an average temperature of −12 °C (10 °F) in the west and −13 °C (9 °F) in the east. The warmest month is July with an average temperature of about +18 °C (64 °F). Although larger than several of Russia's republics, Ivanovo Oblast is the smallest oblast by land area in Russia.

== Politics ==
During the Soviet period, the high authority in the oblast was shared between three persons: the first secretary of the Ivanovo CPSU Committee (who in reality had the greatest authority), the chairman of the oblast Soviet (legislative power), and the Chairman of the oblast Executive Committee (executive power). Since 1991, CPSU has lost all power, when the head of the oblast administration, and eventually the governor, was appointed/elected alongside an elected regional parliament.

The Charter of Ivanovo Oblast is the fundamental law of the region. The Legislative Assembly of Ivanovo Oblast is the province's standing legislative (representative) body. The Legislative Assembly exercises its authority by passing laws, resolutions, and other legal acts and by supervising the implementation and observance of the laws and other legal acts passed by it. The highest executive body is the Oblast Government, which includes territorial executive bodies such as district administrations, committees, and commissions that facilitate development and run the day-to-day matters of the province. The Oblast administration supports the activities of the Governor who is the highest official and acts as guarantor of the observance of the oblast Charter under the Constitution of Russia.

== Demographics ==
Population: 927,828 (2021 census); 1,061,651 (2010 census); 1,148,329 (2002 census); 1,317,117 (1989 Soviet census).

=== Settlements ===
Largest cities or towns in Ivanovo Oblast 2010 Russian Census
Rank		Administrative division	Pop.
1	Ivanovo	City of oblast significance of Ivanovo	408,330
2	Kineshma	Town of oblast significance of Kineshma	88,164
3	Shuya	Town of oblast significance of Shuya	58,486
4	Vichuga	Town of oblast significance of Vichuga	37,583
5	Furmanov	Furmanovsky District	36,144
6	Teykovo	Town of oblast significance of Teykovo	34,976
7	Kokhma	Ivanovsky District	29,411
8	Rodniki	Rodnikovsky District	26,310
9	Privolzhsk	Privolzhsky District	16,747
10	Yuzha	Yuzhsky District	14,170

Vital statistics for 2024:

Historical population
Year	Pop.	±%
1926	1,195,804	—
1939	1,505,043	+25.9%
1959	1,322,152	−12.2%
1970	1,339,110	+1.3%
1979	1,320,968	−1.4%
1989	1,317,117	−0.3%
2002	1,148,329	−12.8%
2010	1,061,651	−7.5%
2021	927,828	−12.6%
Source: Census data

- Births: 6,179 (6.9 per 1,000)
- Deaths: 14,897 (16.5 per 1,000)

Total fertility rate (2024):
1.30 children per woman

Life expectancy (2021):
Total — 69.02 years (male — 64.03, female — 73.86)

Ethnic composition (2010):

- Russians: 95.6%
- Ukrainians: 0.8%
- Tatars: 0.7%
- Armenians: 0.4%
- Azeris: 0.3%
- Others: 2.2%
- 54,882 people were registered from administrative databases, and could not declare an ethnicity. It is estimated that the proportion of ethnicities in this group is the same as that of the declared group.

=== Religion ===
Religion in Ivanovo Oblast as of 2012 (Sreda Arena Atlas)
Russian Orthodoxy	46.5%
Other Orthodox	8.4%
Other Christians	1.9%
Islam	0.5%
Rodnovery and other native faiths	0.5%
Spiritual but not religious	28.1%
Atheism and irreligion	12.9%
Other and undeclared	1.7%

Christianity is the largest religion in Ivanovo Oblast. According to a 2012 survey, 46.5% of the population of Ivanovo Oblast adheres to the Russian Orthodox Church, 8.4% are Orthodox Christian believers who don't belong to church or are members of non-Russian Orthodox churches, 1.8% are unaffiliated generic Christians, 0.5% of the population are adherents of the Slavic native faith (Rodnovery) movement, and 0.5% are Muslims. In addition, 28.1% of the population declares to be "spiritual but not religious", 12.9% is atheist, and 1.3% follows other religions or did not give an answer to the question.

The largest religious centre in the region is the Shartoma Monastery.
