= Yuryevets, Ivanovo Oblast =

Yuryevets Юрьевец
- Town
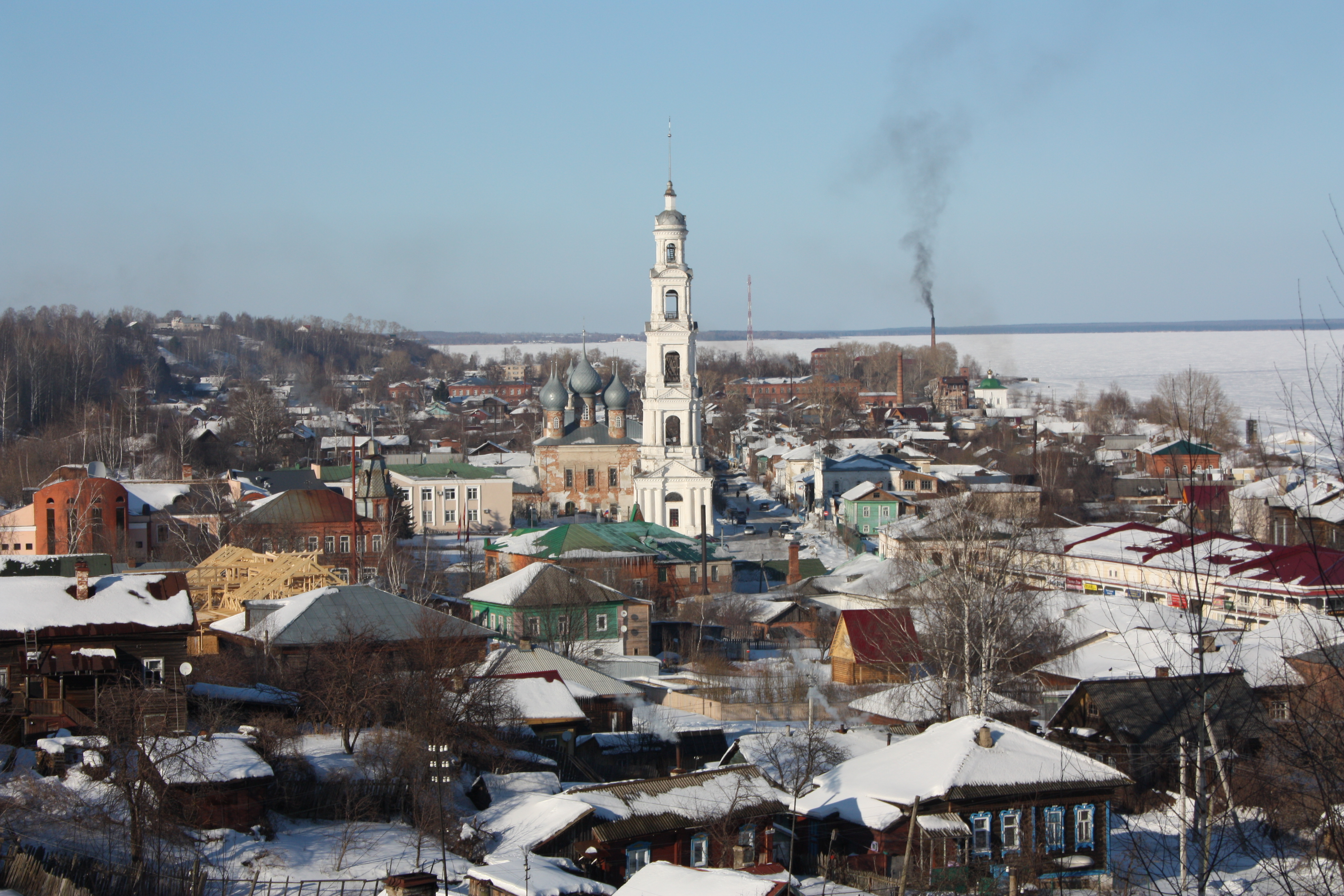
- View of Yuryevets, March 2013

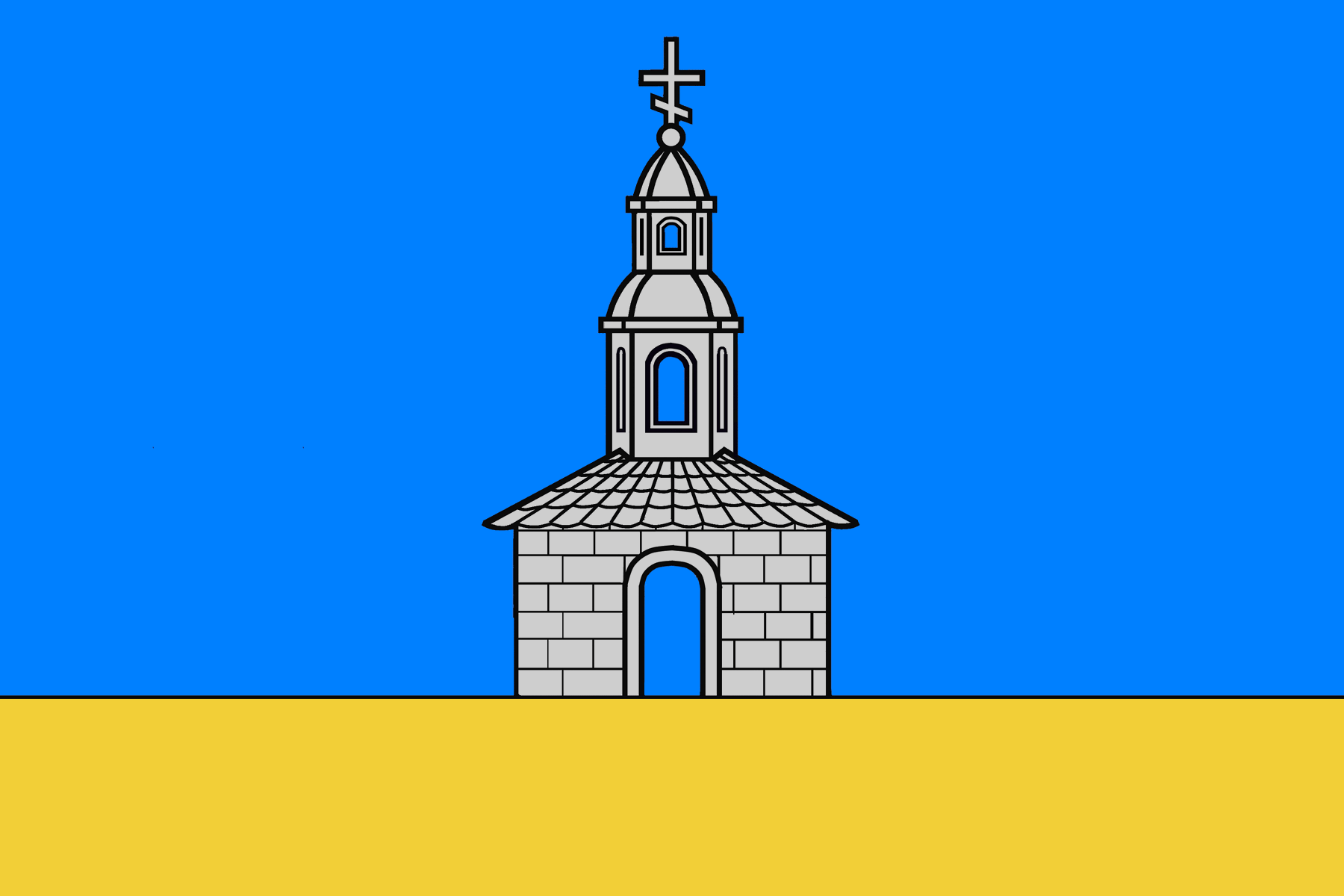
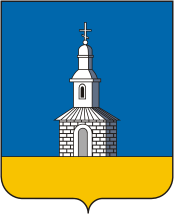
- Flag Coat of arms
- Interactive map of Yuryevets
- Location of Yuryevets Yuryevets (Ivanovo Oblast)
- Coordinates: 57°19′N 43°06′E
- Country: Russia
- Federal subject: Ivanovo Oblast
- Administrative district: Yuryevetsky District
- Founded: 1225
- Elevation: 120 m (390 ft)

Population (2010 Census)
  - Total: 10,210
  - Estimate (2021): 7,899 (−22.6%)

Administrative status
  - Capital of: Yuryevetsky District

Municipal status
  - Municipal district: Yuryevetsky Municipal District
  - Urban settlement: Yuryevetskoye Urban Settlement
  - Capital of: Yuryevetsky Municipal District, Yuryevetskoye Urban Settlement
- Time zone: UTC+3 (MSK)
- Postal codes: 155450, 155452, 155453
- OKTMO ID: 24637101001

Yuryevets is a town (since 1225), the administrative center of Yuryevetsky District of Ivanovo Oblast of the Russian Federation. It is one of the oldest towns in Ivanovo Oblast, with a history spanning at least 801 years, 10 months and 16 days.

== Etymology ==
From the 16th century to 1796, it was officially called Yuryevets-Povolsky. Variant: Yuryev-Povolzhsky (in contrast to the towns Yuryev-Polsky and Yuryev-Livonsky - now Tartu, Estonia). Since the mid-16th century, the name Yuryevets has become widespread, where the distinction is achieved not by a definition, but with the help of the suffix -ets, which is widespread in Russian toponymy (cf. Pereyaslavl - Pereyaslavets, Rostov - Rostovets, etc.).

== Founding ==
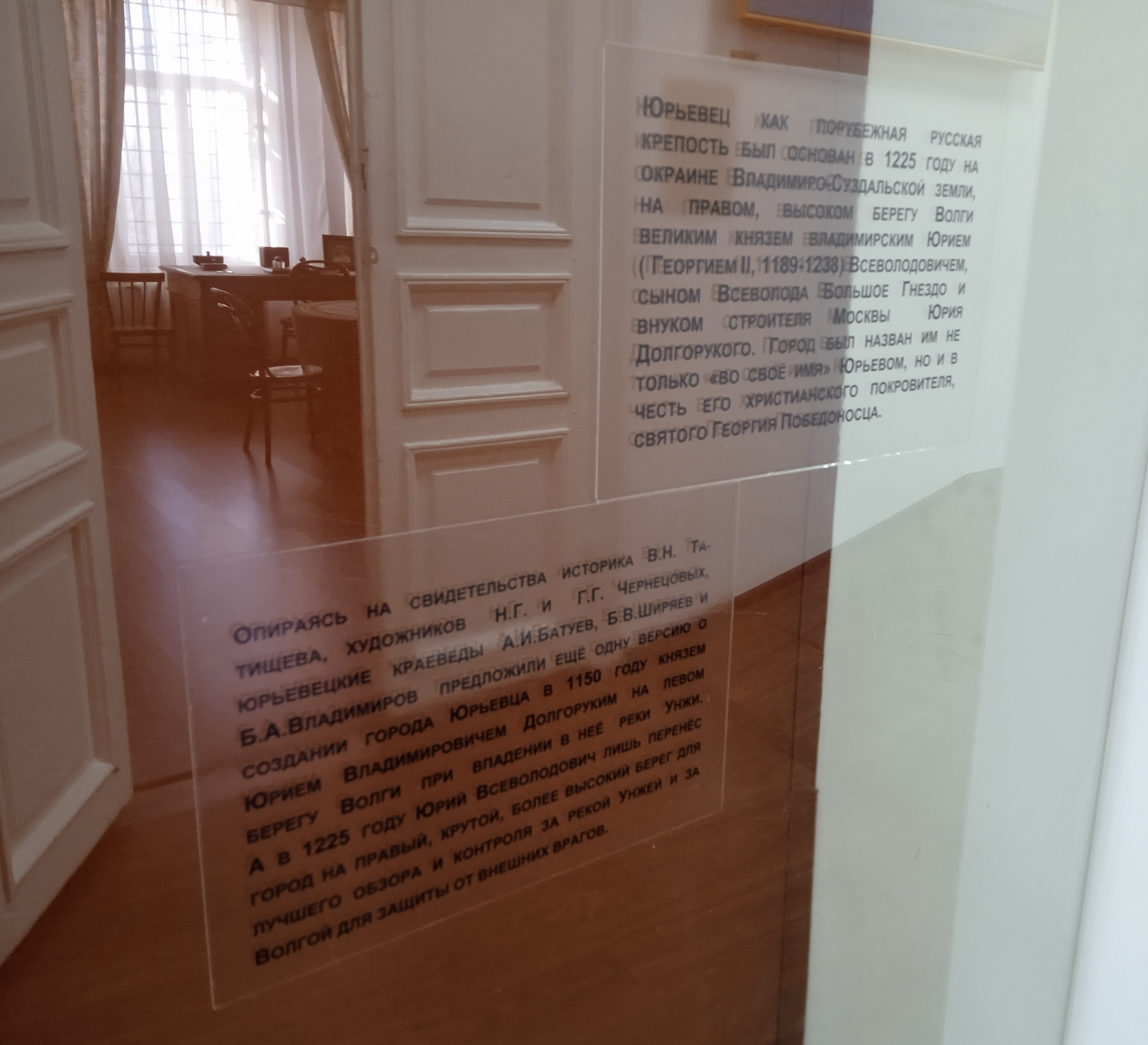
Note about the founding of the town in the Historical and Art Museum

According to the Russian historian of the 18th century V. N. Tatishchev, Yuryevets Povolsky was founded by the Rostov-Suzdal prince Yuri Dolgoruky - in 1150, and not by the Grand Prince of Vladimir Yuri II Vsevolodovich - in 1225, as is currently believed by historical science. Tatishchev's version of the connection between the founding of the town and Yuri Dolgoruky has no confirmation.

The generally accepted version is the foundation of Yuryevets in the first half of the 13th century as a fortification to protect the eastern borders of North-Eastern Russia by the Grand Prince of Vladimir Yuri II Vsevolodovich at the place where the icon of the Great Martyr George the Victorious appeared to him and was named after this saint - Yuryev-Povolsky. The first Yuryevets Kremlin was built on Georgievskaya Gora. In 1897, the famous archaeologist A. A. Spitsyn discovered traces of an ancient settlement on Pusharikha Hill.

According to the historian K. E. Baldin, the oldest towns in the Ivanovo Oblast are Plyos and Yuryevets.

The town was first mentioned in the "List of Russian cities, near and far" (1380-1390).

In 2013, during archaeological excavations on the Turgenev Plateau, an icon-medallion with the image of the Virgin Orans was discovered, which became additional evidence of the early date of the founding of the town of Yuryevets.

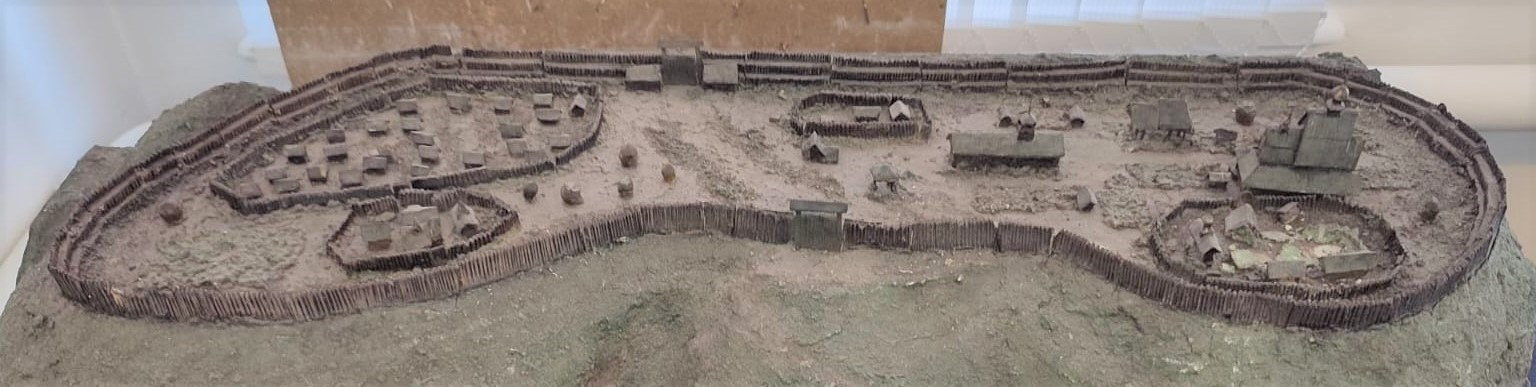
Model of the fortress town of Yuryevets-Povolsky in the 13th century on Georgievskaya Gora. Historical and Art Museum of the town of Yuryevets.

== History ==
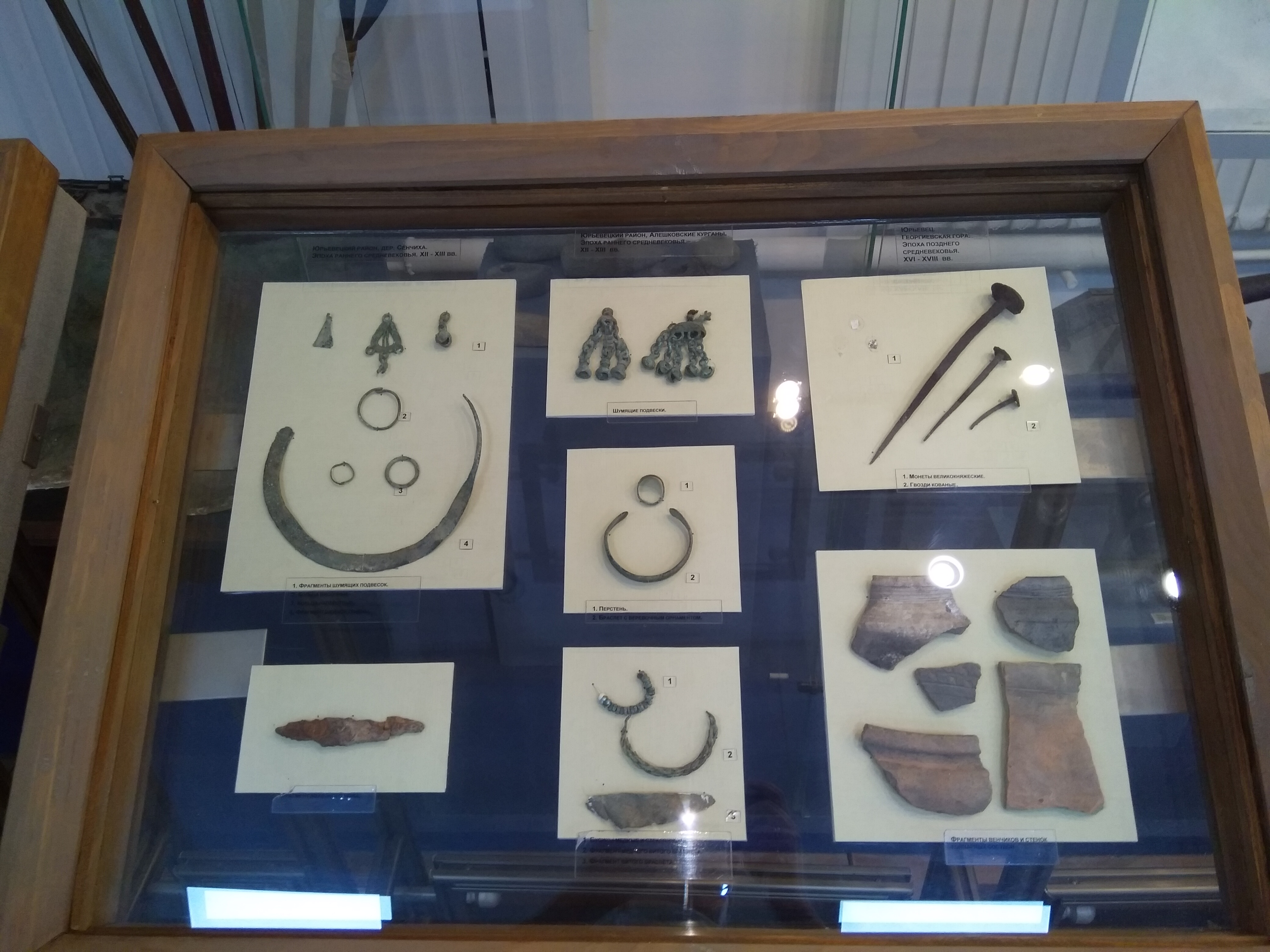
Archaeological finds of the Middle Ages in Yuryevets and Yuryevetsky district. Right vertical row: Yuryevets, Georgievskaya Gora, 16th-18th centuries. Historical and Art Museum of the town of Yuryevets.

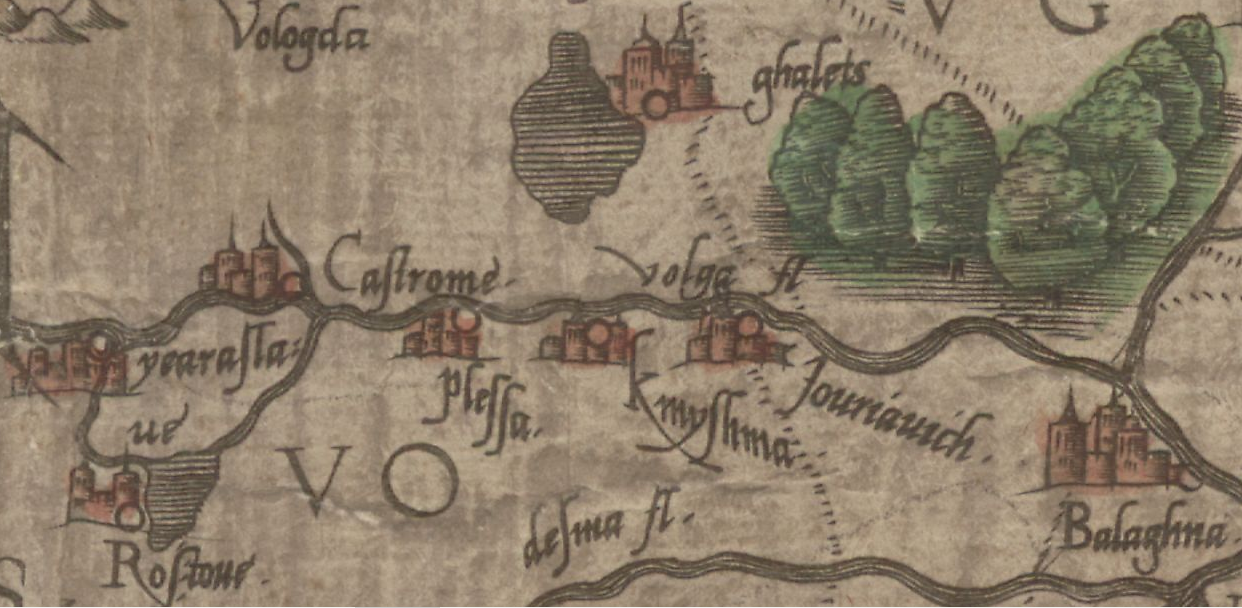
Yuryevets on the map "Description of Russia, Muscovy and Tartary", published by the English ambassador and traveler Anthony Jenkinson in 1562 in London

In 1237, the town was destroyed by the troops of the Mongol Khan Batu Khan, who invaded Russia. It was part of the Gorodets principality. In 1380, Yuryevets soldiers participated in the Battle of Kulikovo. In 1593-1594, the "Sotnaya Gramota of 1593/94 on the posad of Yuryevets Povolsky" was compiled, the first census - a unique document on the history of the 16th century. In 1552, by decree of Ivan IV, Yuryevets was transferred to the udel of the Astrakhan prince Kaibula. In 1556 Ivan the Terrible assigned Yuryevets to the oprichnina.

In January 1609, in Yuryevets, the local militia under the leadership of the sorcerer Fyodor Krasny rose up against the Polish-Lithuanian interventionists. In the same year, 1609, the town was burned by the Polish-Lithuanian detachment of the Polish nobleman Aleksander Jozef Lisowski. In 1614, it was plundered by ataman Ivan Zarutsky. A new ostrog was built on Predtechenskaya Gora. The length of its walls was 700 m, there were two gates. In 1619-1620, in honor of the victory over the Polish-Lithuanian interventionists, by order of the posad people, the Epiphany Church was erected (the current building was built around 1720).

In the 17th century, Yuryev-Povolsky became an important trading town. The future famous figure of Old Believers archpriest Avvakum served in the town. In 1652, after the second escape from the village of Lopatitsy, where he served as a priest and was persecuted for demanding strict piety, Avvakum was appointed archpriest in Yuryev-Povolsky. Here he condemned any deviation from piety and collected taxes for the patriarchal treasury, which turned the clergy and the flock against him. In May–June of the same year, Avvakum was severely beaten by the crowd, and he fled to Kostroma, and then to Moscow.

In 1655, the plague epidemic claimed the lives of three quarters of the population of Yuryevets.

In 1661, on Voskresenskaya Gora, by decree of Tsar Alexei Mikhailovich, a large stone kremlin was laid - "White Town". According to the census of 1676, it numbered 407 posad and 175 non-taxable households. Trade was actively conducted on the town square, blacksmithing, leather, pottery and other crafts were developed. However, due to the different priorities of the new Tsar Peter I, the construction of the kremlin was not completed. Since 1780, it was dismantled for bricks. Currently, a reminder of the fortress remains an earthen rampart with a moat and a lake, local residents call this area "White Town".

In 1708-1714 and 1717-1719 Yuryevets had the status of a uyezd town of the Kazan Governorate, in 1714-1717 and 1719-1778 - a uyezd town of the Nizhny Novgorod Governorate, since 1719 - the Nizhny Novgorod province as part of this province, in 1778-1796 - the Kostroma Viceroyalty, in 1796-1918 - the Kostroma Governorate. In 1700, the Annunciation Church was built. In 1746, the Transfiguration Church was built and consecrated. The highest body of urban self-government was the magistrate. It consisted of two burgomasters and four councilors. Since 1785, in addition to the magistrate, a city duma was introduced, headed by the city head. During the reform of Catherine II in 1775, the position of Gorodnichiy was introduced in Yuryevets. To maintain order, an invalid team was created, and tenths were recruited. In 1778 - Yuryevets received the status of a town. On March 29, 1779, Empress Catherine II "For the services of the town to the state, granted Yuryevets a personal coat of arms." In accordance with the general plan of 1795, a regular layout was implemented in the town. The land surveyors were P. Shubnikov and I. Gove. In 1798, the Uprava Blagochiniya was opened. At the end of the 18th century, a postal tract with a postal station was opened in Yuryevets. By 1800, there were already 10 pairs of postal horses. In 1806, a special house was built for the post office. According to censuses at the end of the 18th century, there were about 500 houses in Yuryevets. Most of the population consisted of townspeople. Merchants, clergy, officials, and retired soldiers also lived there. In total, about 1,500 revision souls were registered in the town.

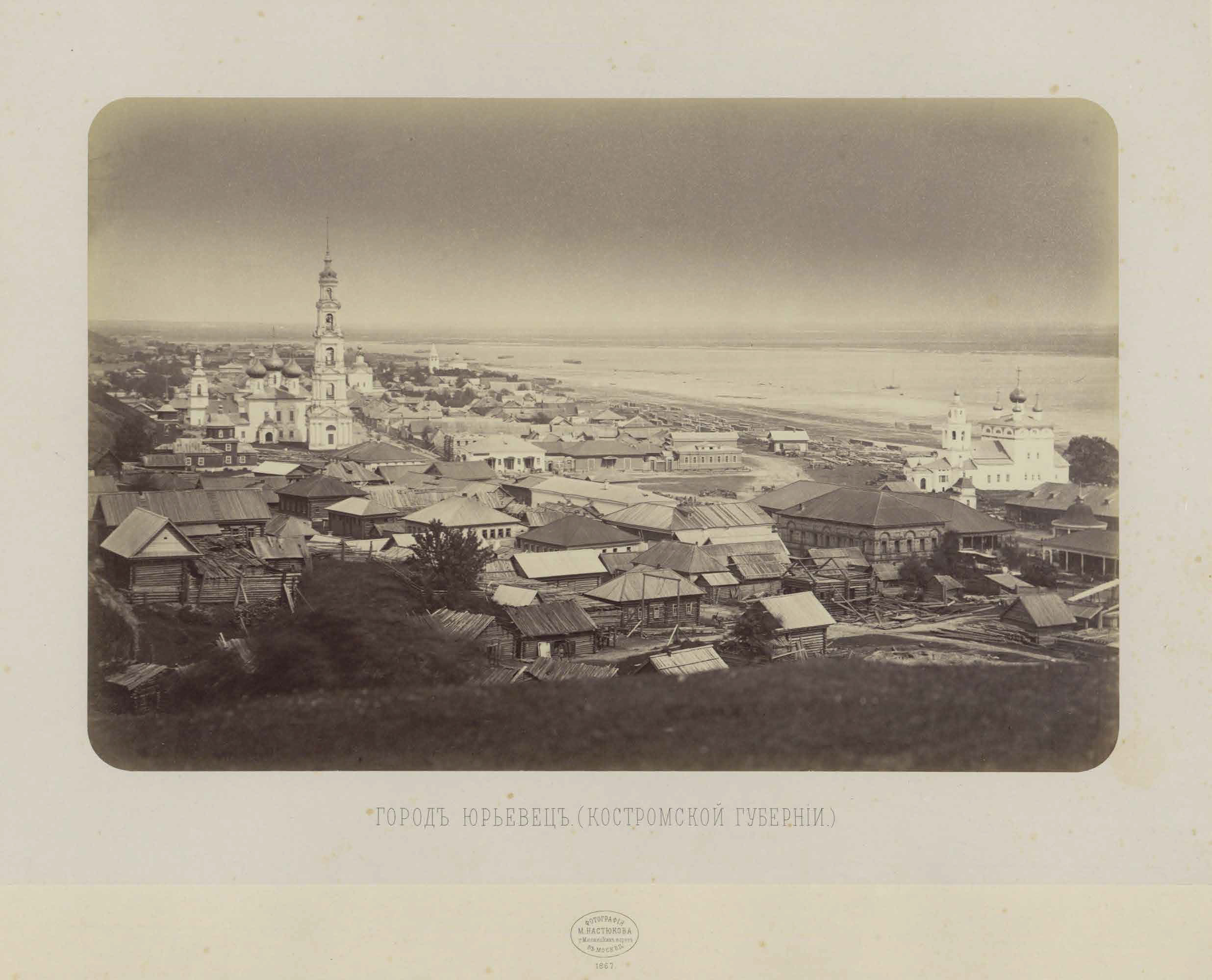
Yuryevets in 1867

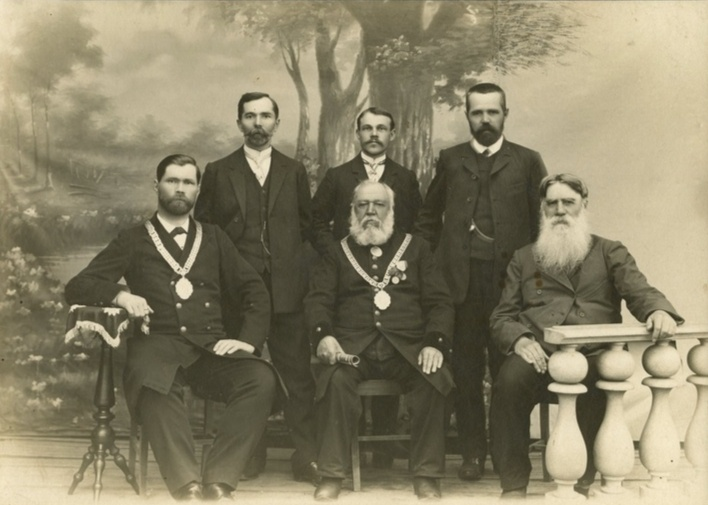
V. E. Litsov, head of the city council (from 1894 to 1912) with colleagues, 1911

In 1800, the stone Church of the Forerunner with a bell tower was built. In 1815 - the Christmas Church. In 1816, on the initiative of the head of the district internal guard, a hospital was opened in Yuryevets to treat soldiers of the invalid team and prisoners. This was the first medical institution in the town. In 1820, a parish church school was opened. By the 1820s, there were about 140 private shops in Yuryevets, united in trading rows according to the goods sold. Since the mid-19th century, a large cargo-passenger pier has been formed. In 1871, the Yuryevets flax-spinning factory was built and the first meteorological observations began in Yuryevets. In 1838, a special public house was built for a hotel. In 1876, the Yuryevets District Library named after F. S. Gribunin was founded. In 1878, the almshouse of the Yuryevets city house of care for the elderly and disabled of both sexes was opened. In 1880, M. I. Krasilnikov founded a brewery in Yuryevets. On April 23, 1889, the Yuryevets almshouse for poor citizens was opened. In 1895, the Moscow company "Brant and Co" acquired a plot of land from the Krivozersky Monastery and began construction of the largest sawmill in the Volga region on the left bank of the Volga, opposite the town of Yuryevets. As a result, housing for workers was quickly built around the plant, forming the village of Novaya Slobodka. At the end of the 19th - beginning of the 20th century, with the assistance of the city head Vasily Eremeevich Litsov, a women's gymnasium and a craft school were opened in the town, and the streets were paved. In 1904, the first zemstvo hospital was opened. In 1906, a starch factory was built. In 1911 the Summer Theater was opened in the town park. On July 18 (old style) 1914, the 323rd Yuryevets Infantry Regiment was formed and transferred to defend the Ivangorod fortress.

=== Soviet period ===
On December 22, 1917 (January 4, 1918), Soviet power was established in Yuryevets. On May 10–12, 1918, in the hall of the Zemstvo Council, the first uyezd Congress of Soviets was held. In 1918-1929 Yuryevets had the status of a uyezd town of the Ivanovo-Voznesensk Governorate, in 1929-1930 - the district center of the Kineshma Okrug of the Ivanovo Industrial Oblast, in 1930-1936 - the center of the Yuryevetsky district of the Ivanovo Industrial Oblast, from March 11, 1936 to 1963 and since 1965 - the center of the Yuryevetsky district of the Ivanovo Oblast. On May 17, 1921, by the decision of the Plenum of the Yuryevets Uyezd Executive Committee, the Yuryevets City Council of Workers' and Peasants' Deputies was organized. On April 1, 1923, the Yuryevets State Shipping Administration was organized, and the Yuryevets archive was also established. In 1928, the district industrial complex was created. In 1929, the Yuryevets chemical forestry was created. On April 10, 1939, by the decision of the Ivanovo Regional Executive Committee, an air mail and passenger line was organized along the north-eastern route covering the district centers.

By January 25, 1945, the workers of the Yuryevets timber industry, the staff of the Yuryevetsles trust, and the rafting office had collected 175,000 rubles for the tank column "Forest Worker". During the Great Patriotic War, 6,847 residents of the town and the district did not return from the front.

In 1954-1957, during the construction of the Gorky Reservoir, a protective dam with a length of 3.2 km was built, however, despite these measures, part of the historical buildings in the northern and southern parts of the town was lost. In the Yuryevets district, the work on the resettlement of the flooded zone began in 1950, although until February 1952 there was no management system. The Ivanovo Regional Executive Committee decided to withdraw 39,621 hectares of land, including 26,687 hectares of collective farms (51 collective farms) and 13,004 hectares of other land users, for the reservoir pit. This affected a total of 22 village councils and 81 settlements. There were 384 state institutions in the flooded zone, some of which were transferred to the Ivanovo Oblast, and some to the neighboring Kostroma Oblast. The Krasny Profintern sawmill and the rural hospital were moved to Glazovaya Gora, and the wooden two-story secondary school was moved to Seletskoye Pole. The bakery was moved from the village of Novaya Slobodka to Yuryevets, the residential houses of individuals were dismantled and moved to different parts of the town. In 1967, an obelisk was erected in memory of the soldiers - Yuryevets residents who died during the Great Patriotic War. By the resolution of the State Committee of the Council of Ministers of the RSFSR of July 31, 1970 No. 36, Yuryevets was included in the number of historical towns with valuable urban planning ensembles and complexes, natural landscapes and an ancient cultural layer. In 1983, traffic was opened on the Puchezh-Yuryevets highway, connecting the Greater Ivanovo Ring.

=== Post-Soviet period ===
Almost all town-forming enterprises (except for the woodworking plant, partially) were closed, the production buildings of the flax-spinning and combing factory, the cannery, the fish factory, the brewery, the bakery, the inter-farm mobile mechanized column (MPMK), the brick factory, the dairy factory were destroyed. The river port "Yuryevets" is not functioning.

In 2000, the reconstruction of the shore protection dam began. In 2003, the oldest enterprise of the town, the Yuryevets Flax Factory, was closed.

At least from 1967 to 2021, the population of the town was continuously decreasing, having decreased almost 2.7 times, from 21,000 to 7,899 people (see table below).

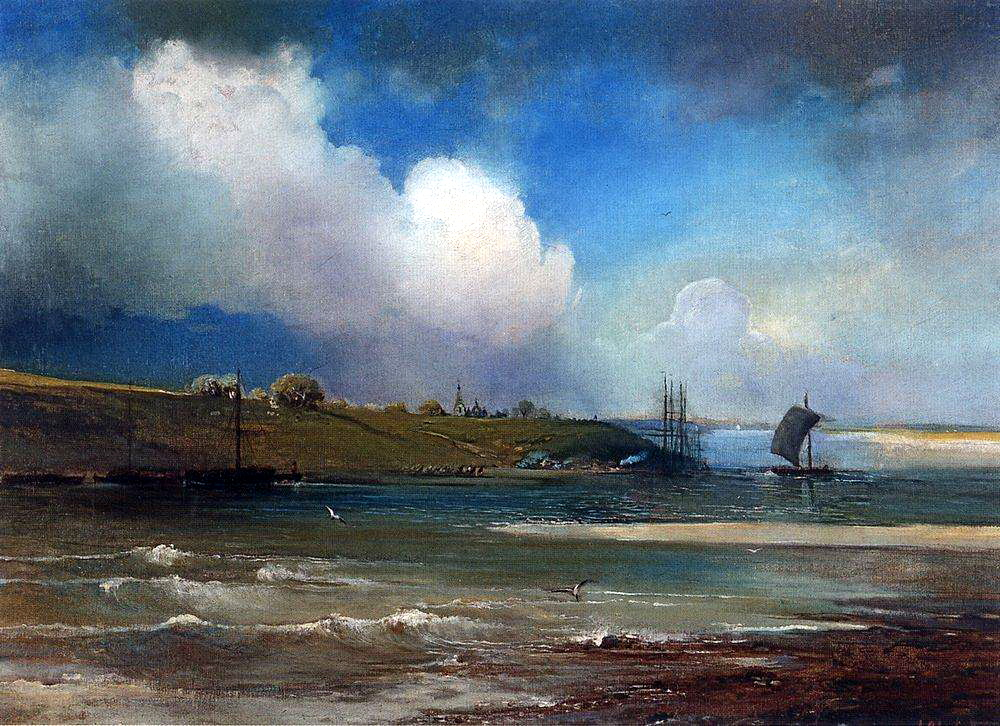
Alexey Savrasov. View of the Volga near Yuryevets. 1870s

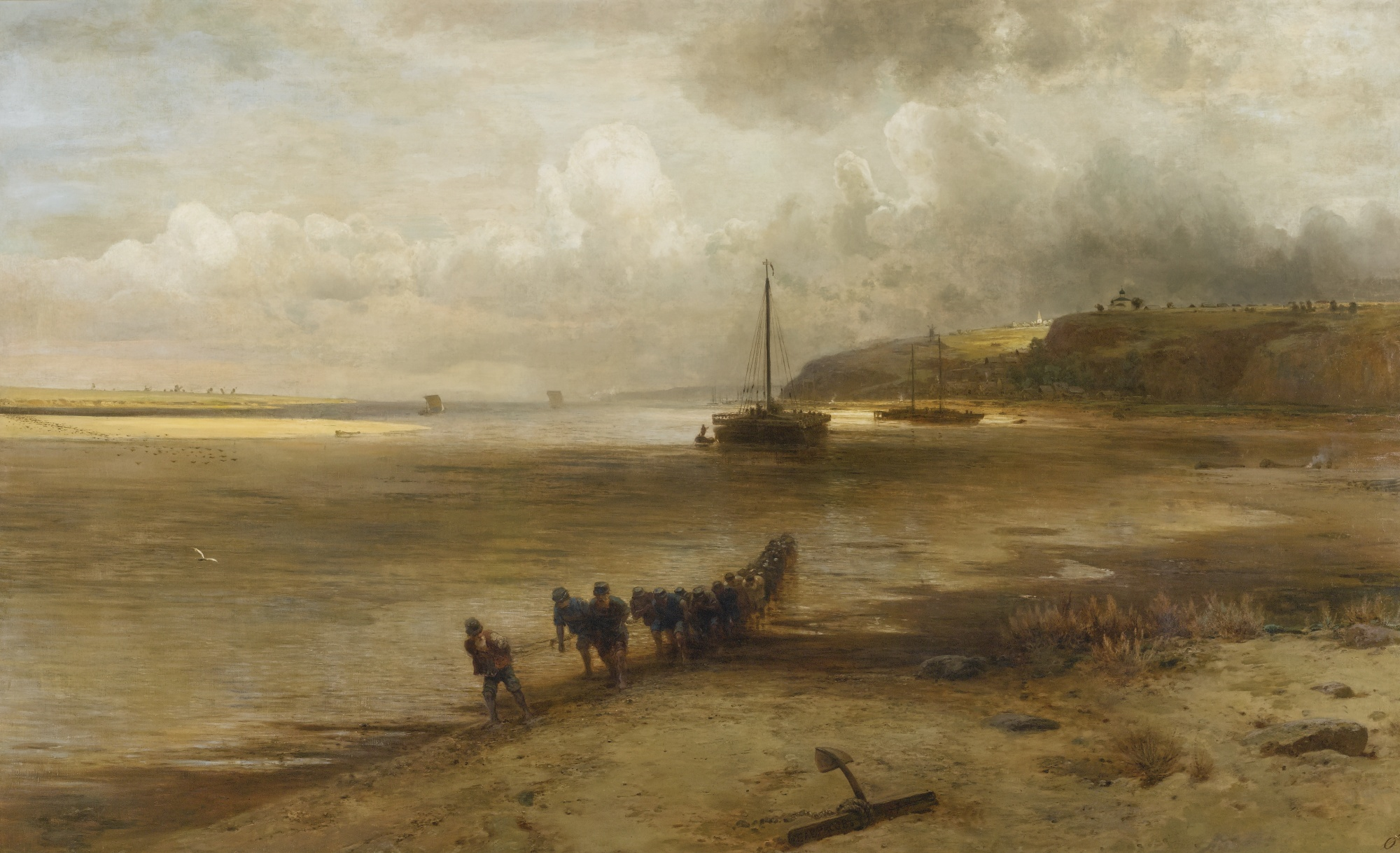
Savrasov A. K. The Volga near Yuryevets. 1871

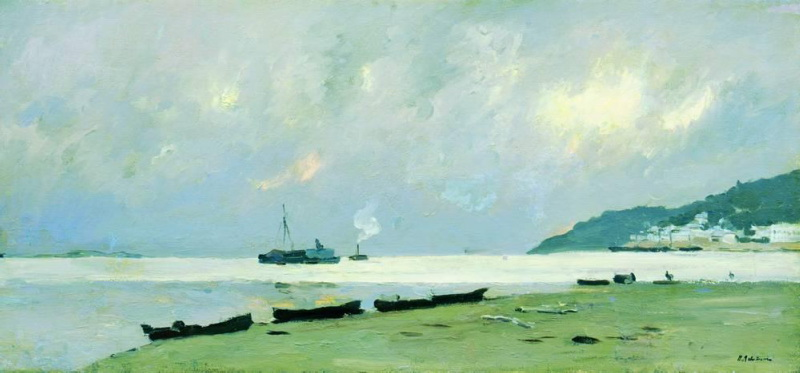
Isaac Levitan. Yuryevets. Cloudy day on the Volga. 1890

The 800th anniversary of Yuryevets, which, according to the Government of the Ivanovo Oblast, is the oldest town in the Ivanovo Oblast, is planned to be celebrated at the state level in 2025.

== Physical and geographical characteristics ==
Geographical location

Initially, the fortress town stood on the so-called Georgievskaya Gora, which was demolished and used in the construction of the shore protection dam of the Gorky Reservoir. Located on the right bank of the Volga River (Gorky Reservoir and opposite the mouth of the Unzha and Nyomda rivers, 159 km northeast of the regional center - the city of Ivanovo, 58 km from the railway station "Kineshma". The town covers an area of 8 km^{2} (3.1 sq mi). The height of the town center is 130 m above sea level. The height of the level of the "Yuryevets Sea" - the Gorky Reservoir - is 84 m. The width of the reservoir opposite the town is up to 15 km.

Time zone

Yuryevets, like the entire Ivanovo Oblast, is located in the time zone, designated according to the international standard as Moscow Time Zone (MSK/MSD). The offset relative to Coordinated Universal Time UTC is +3:00 (MSD).

== Climate ==
Climate data for Yuryevets (1991–2020, extremes 1955–present)
Month	Jan	Feb	Mar	Apr	May	Jun	Jul	Aug	Sep	Oct	Nov	Dec	Year
Record high °C (°F)	4.9 (40.8)	6.8 (44.2)	17.5 (63.5)	27.8 (82.0)	32.2 (90.0)	33.9 (93.0)	36.0 (96.8)	35.3 (95.5)	28.9 (84.0)	22.2 (72.0)	12.8 (55.0)	8.8 (47.8)	36.0 (96.8)
Mean daily maximum °C (°F)	−6.4 (20.5)	−5.3 (22.5)	1.0 (33.8)	10.1 (50.2)	18.2 (64.8)	21.8 (71.2)	24.3 (75.7)	21.7 (71.1)	15.5 (59.9)	7.6 (45.7)	−0.3 (31.5)	−4.7 (23.5)	8.6 (47.5)
Daily mean °C (°F)	−9.2 (15.4)	−8.5 (16.7)	−2.8 (27.0)	5.2 (41.4)	12.6 (54.7)	16.7 (62.1)	19.2 (66.6)	16.9 (62.4)	11.4 (52.5)	4.7 (40.5)	−2.3 (27.9)	−7.0 (19.4)	4.7 (40.5)
Mean daily minimum °C (°F)	−11.7 (10.9)	−11.3 (11.7)	−6.0 (21.2)	1.2 (34.2)	7.9 (46.2)	12.3 (54.1)	14.8 (58.6)	12.7 (54.9)	8.0 (46.4)	2.5 (36.5)	−4.1 (24.6)	−9.3 (15.3)	1.4 (34.6)
Record low °C (°F)	−42.8 (−45.0)	−36.1 (−33.0)	−31.1 (−24.0)	−18.9 (−2.0)	−4.0 (24.8)	1.0 (33.8)	3.6 (38.5)	1.1 (34.0)	−5.5 (22.1)	−15.0 (5.0)	−29.2 (−20.6)	−44.0 (−47.2)	−44.0 (−47.2)
Average precipitation mm (inches)	45 (1.8)	35 (1.4)	33 (1.3)	39 (1.5)	45 (1.8)	66 (2.6)	65 (2.6)	60 (2.4)	52 (2.0)	68 (2.7)	53 (2.1)	48 (1.9)	609 (24.1)
Source: Погода и Климат

Ecological condition

Yuryevets is one of the most ecologically clean areas of central Russia, it is believed that the Yuryevets area is a territory with the lowest radioactive background. The town is adjacent to a coniferous forest consisting of spruce and pine trees. There is a town forest - "Nagornaya Dacha". 3 km from the town in the Gorky Reservoir there is an archipelago "Asafovy Gory", a specially protected natural area. It was formed after the creation of the Gorky Reservoir on the site of the hill of the same name on the left bank of the Volga.

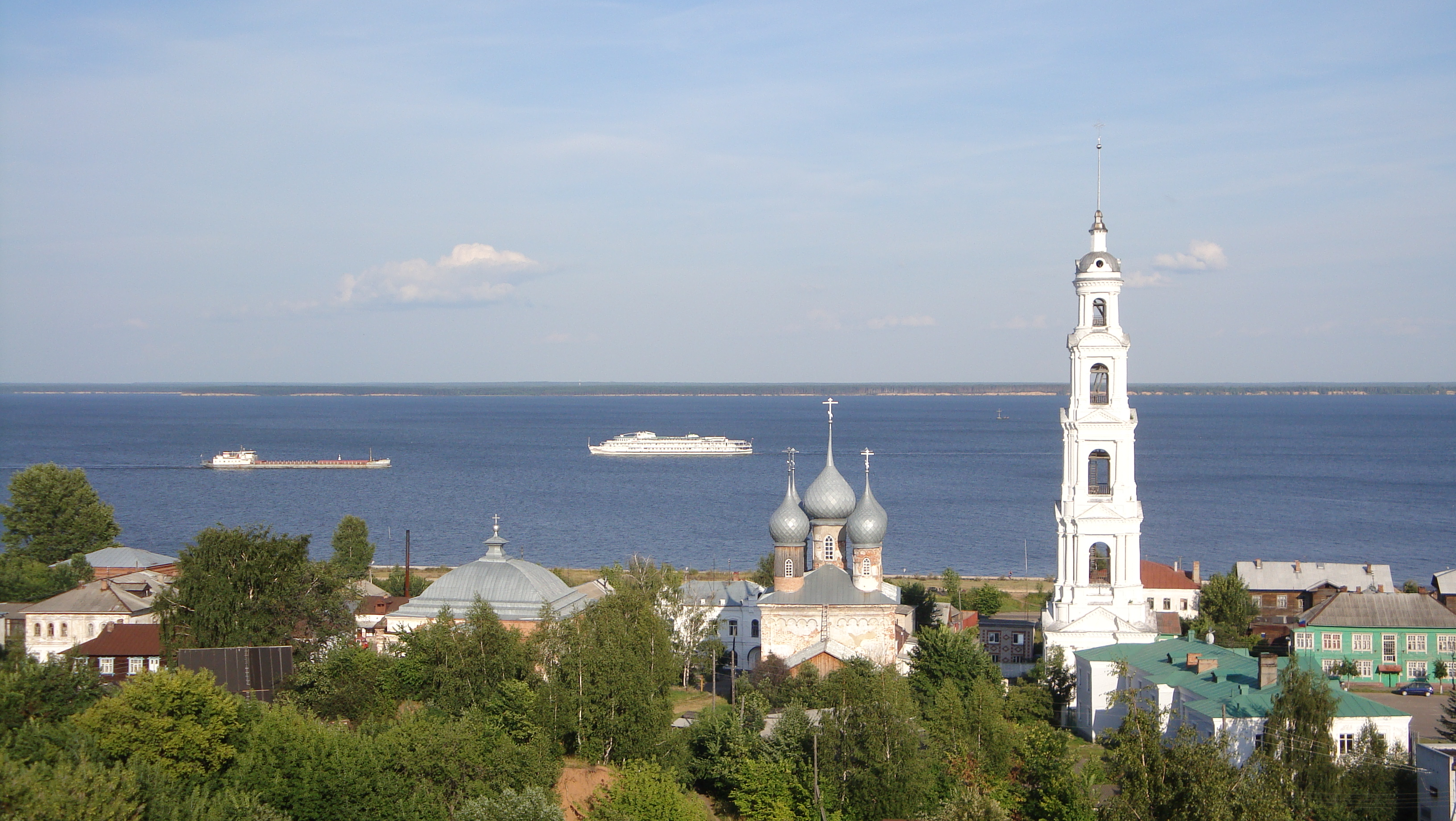

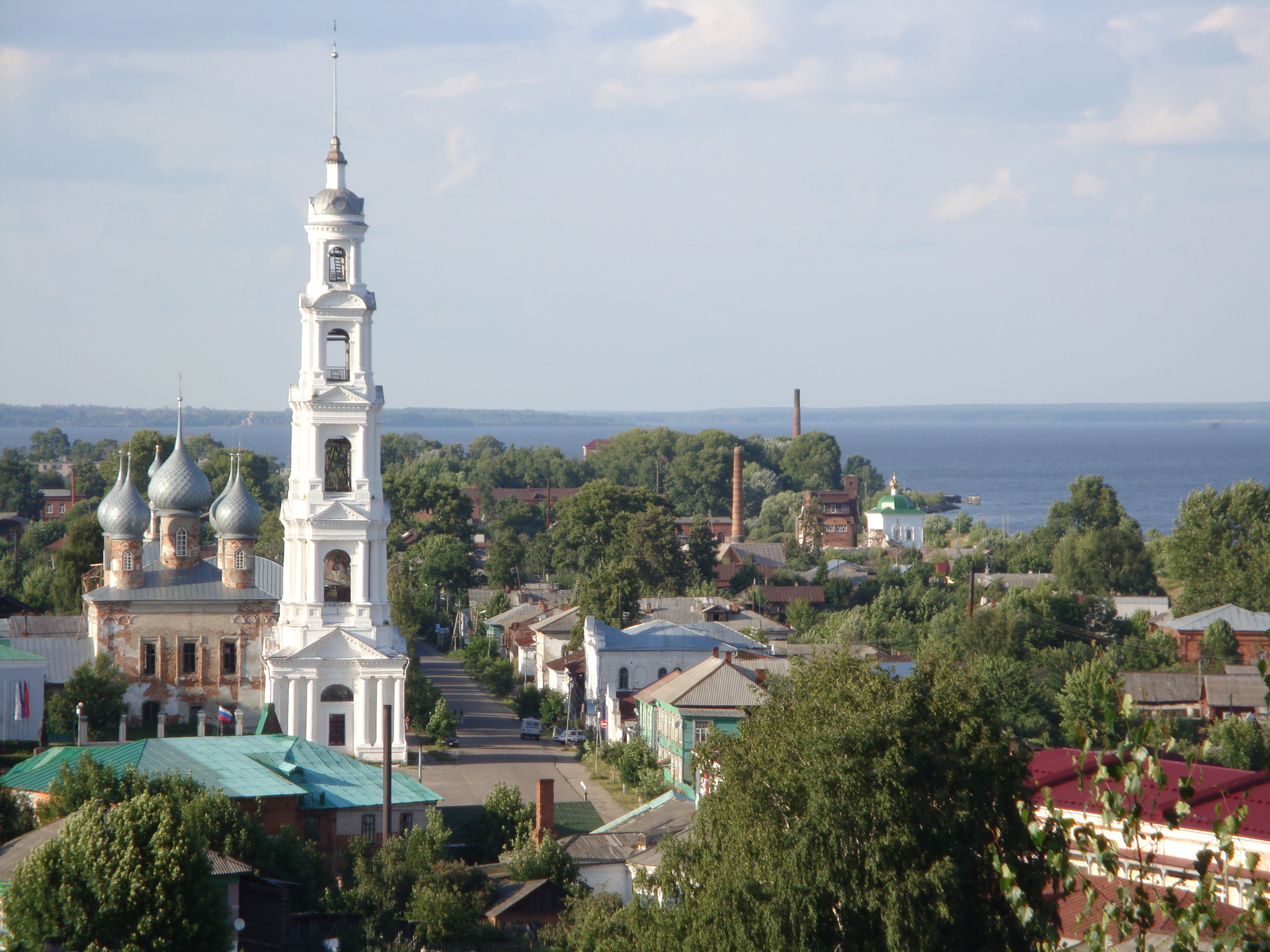

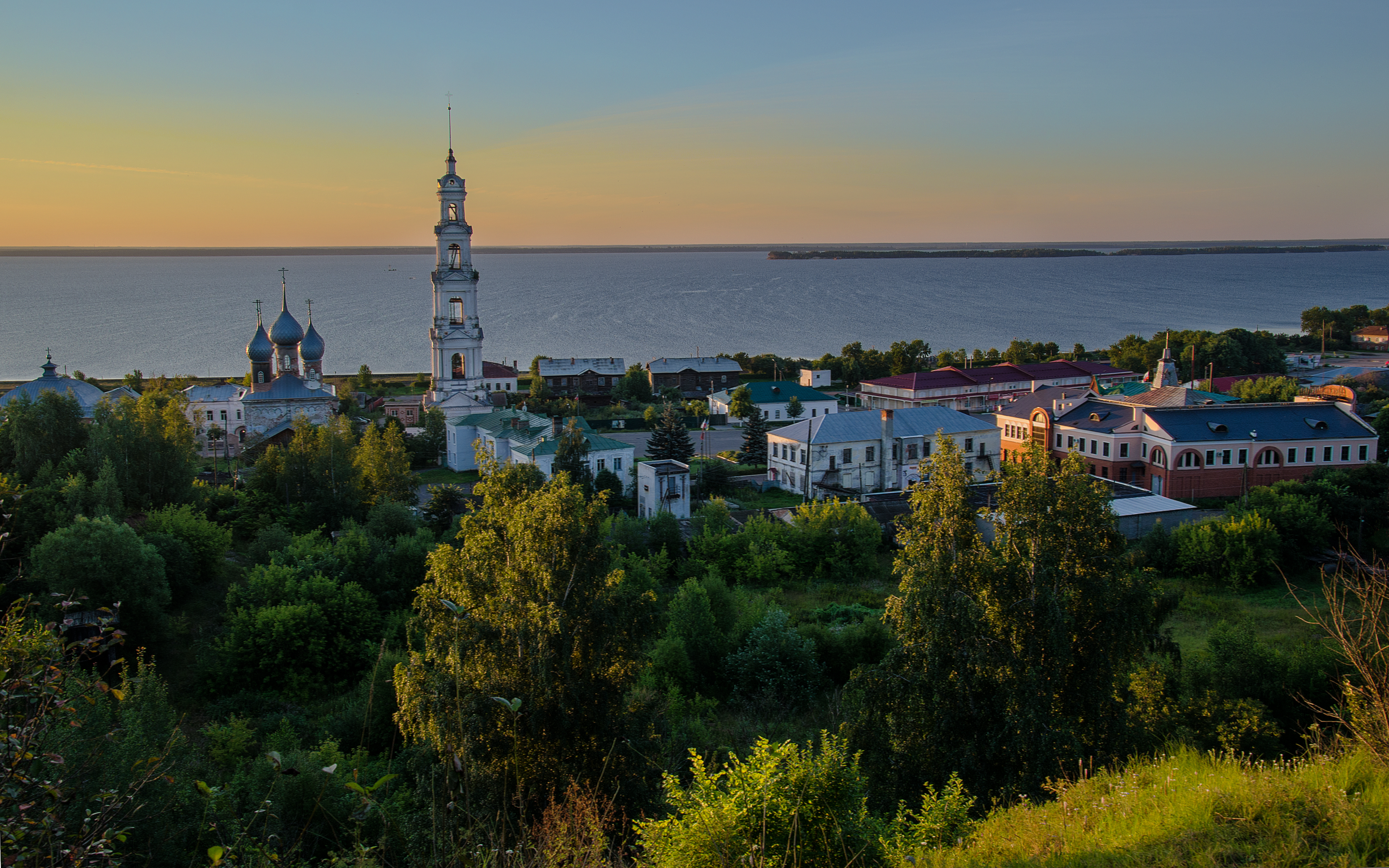

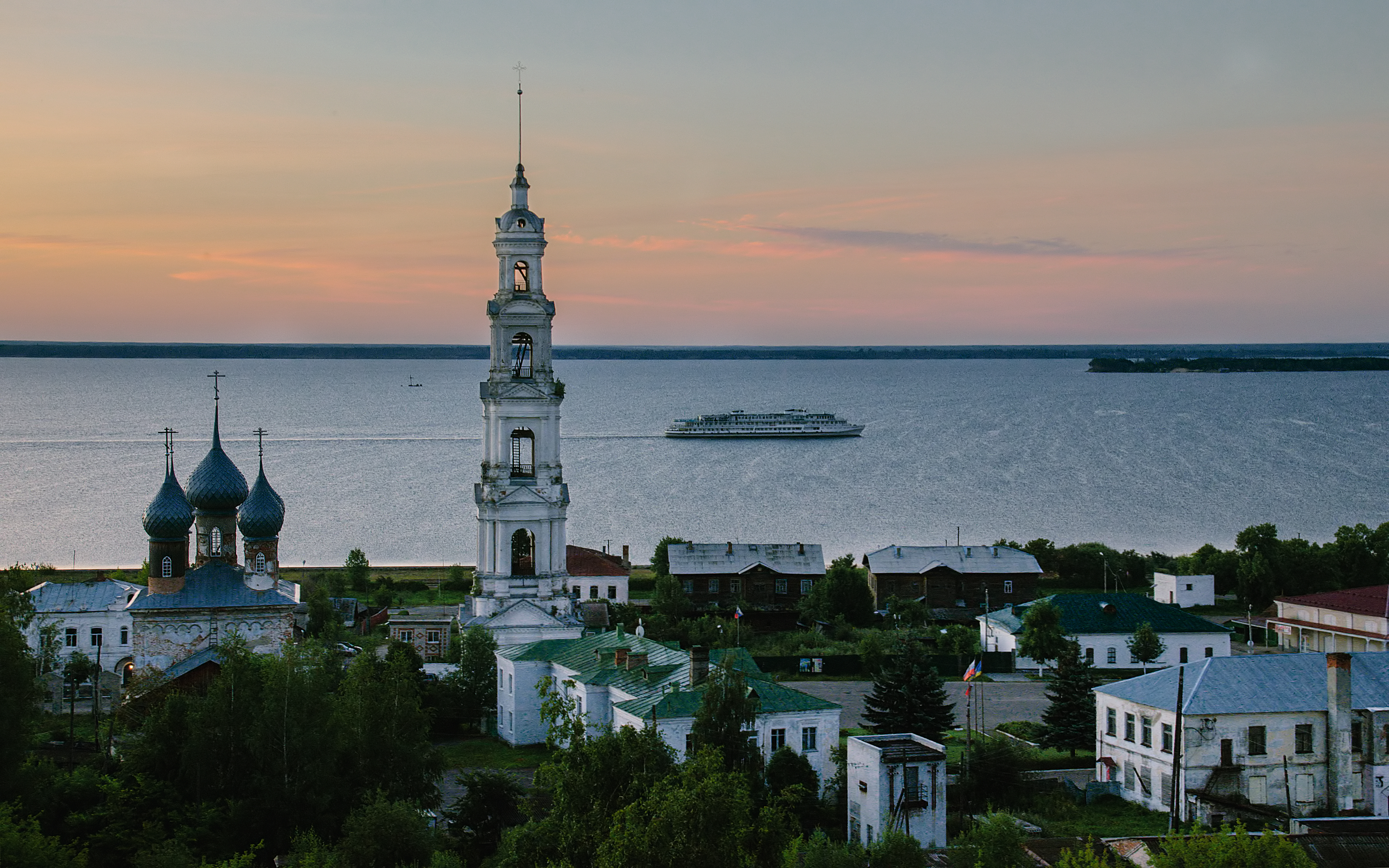

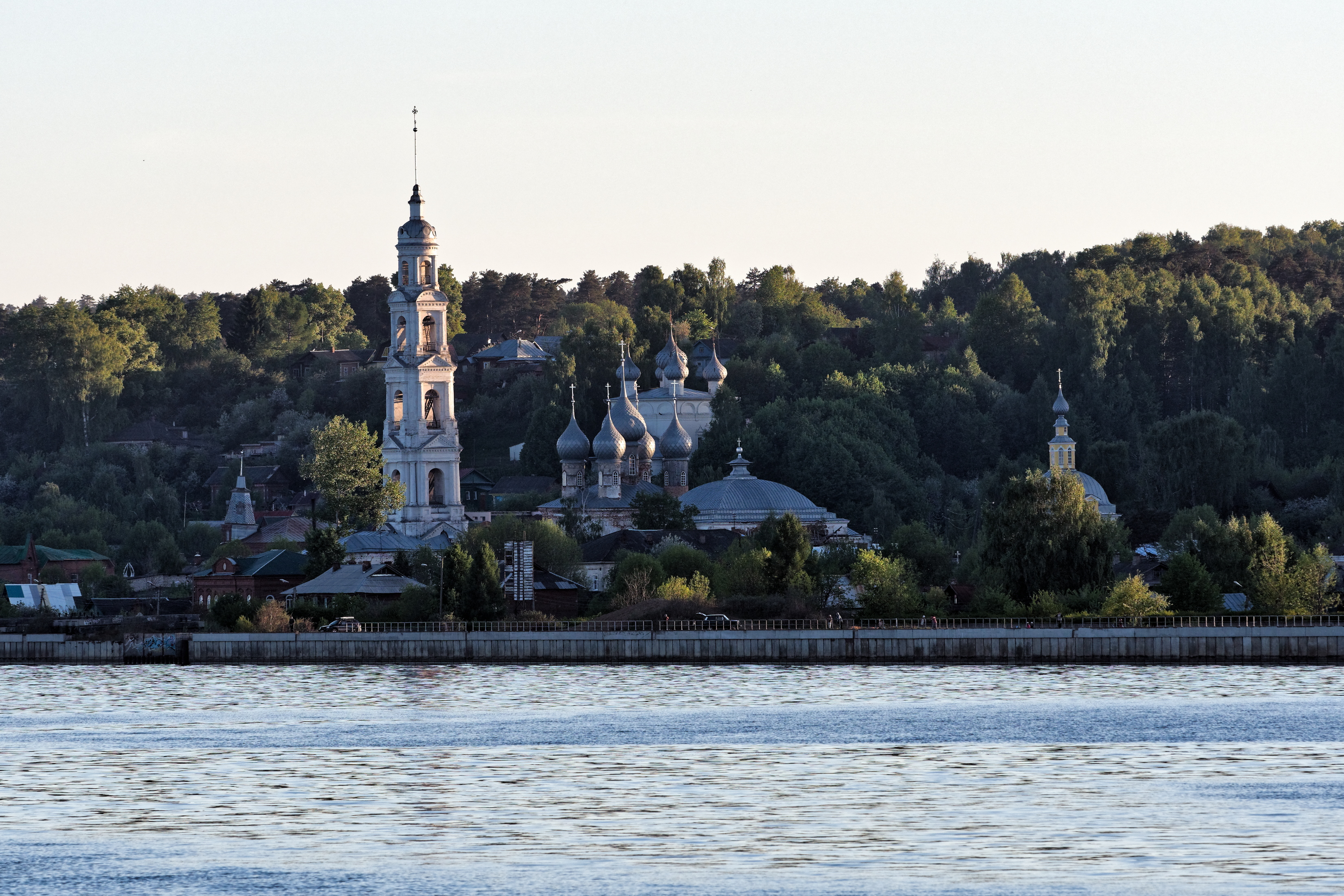

== Population ==
According to statistical reports for 1979-2009, there is a constant annual decrease in the population. In the period from 1979 to 1995, the annual population decline was 150-170 people, for the period from 1995 to 2002 - about 550 people, for the period 2002-2009 - about 190 people. Over 30 years (1979-2009), the population of the town decreased from 18.3 thousand people to 11.3 thousand people, that is, by 7 thousand people (about 40%). At the moment, the population decline continues. An important factor determining the demographic situation in the town and the oblast as a whole is a gradual increase in the natural population decline caused by an increase in mortality and a decrease in the birth rate, as well as population migration.

One of the main reasons for the mass outflow of population to other towns and regions is the lack of jobs in the town. Most often, residents are forced to look for work in towns such as Ivanovo, Moscow and Nizhny Novgorod, which leads to population migration.

National composition

According to the 2020 census, the following nationalities lived in the town (nationalities less than 0.1% and other, see footnote to the line "Other"):

Nationality	Population, people	Share
Russians	7550	95.58%
Azerbaijanis	16	0.20%
Ukrainians	15	0.19%
Tatars	14	0.18%
Other	304	3.85%
Total	7899	100.00%

== Economy ==
In the late 1980s, the town's industry was represented by a number of enterprises operating mainly on the basis of local raw materials from an active agricultural zone of dairy and vegetable, and flax-growing specialization - a dairy plant, a flax combing and spinning factory, fish and canning and brewing plants, a woodworking plant, a bakery, brick factories, as well as a number of small enterprises. The total number of people employed in industry as of January 1, 1988 was 4.1 thousand people, or 58.7% of the total working population.

The modern economy of the town of Yuryevets includes organizations involved in the production and distribution of electricity, gas and water. Among these organizations are: OAO Domoupravlenie, OAO Yuryevetskiye Electric Networks, ООО Akva-gorod, ООО Teplo-Gorod, as well as small enterprises that produce products both for the needs of the town and for sale outside of it: ООО Furniture Omega, ООО Techservice, ООО Visit, Yuryevets Paper Company, and sewing workshops.

== Transport ==
Bus service: Buses provide suburban and intercity service - with Moscow, Ivanovo, Kineshma, Nizhny Novgorod and others.

The city route is served by 2-3 buses on schedule, and buses also run in the district according to the schedule. There is a city taxi service.

Passenger shipping, which was carried out along the Volga in the 19th-20th centuries, has ceased in recent times, the river station was sold in 2009 to the local ООО Yacht Club. But in 2022, the route "Nizhny Novgorod - Chkalovsk - Yuryevets" was resumed using the high-speed vessel "Valdai 45R".

The nearest railway station is located in the town of Kineshma at a distance of 60 km from Yuryevets. The station "Kineshma" was opened in 1871 as part of the line Ivanovo-Voznesensk - Kineshma of the Shuya-Ivanovo Railway, now the Northern Railway of the Yaroslavl region of the Northern Railway.

The nearest crossing over the Volga is near the village of Bystritsa - the village of Stolpino.

== Architecture ==
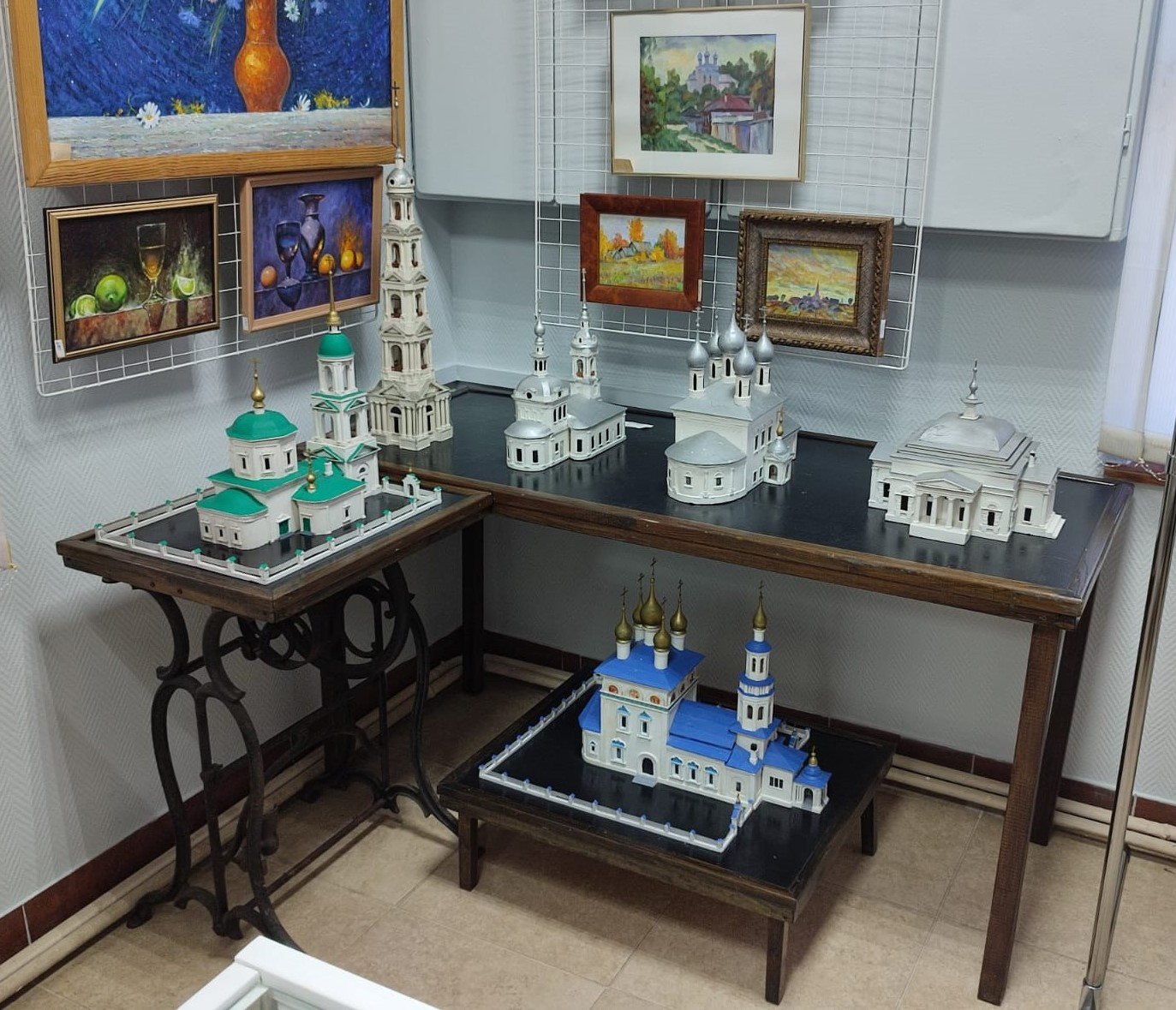
Models of Yuryevets churches. Andrei Tarkovsky Museum

In the center of the town is Georgievskaya Square with historical buildings:

the ensemble of the Cathedrals of the Entry of the Lord into Jerusalem (1733, rebuilt in 1806, architect N. I. Metlin) and the Assumption of the Blessed Virgin Mary (1825-1833) and the Church of St. George the Victorious in a five-tiered bell tower (1840, the latter two - architect P. I. Fursov), the courtyard of the St. Nicholas-Tikhon Monastery,

the building of the former drinking house (Pavlovsky House) (before 1779),

stone shopping arcades (third quarter of the 19th century),

Shop and sewing workshop of the city head A. L. Flyagin,

There are other architectural monuments:

Church of the Epiphany (circa 1720, Naryshkin Baroque, bell tower and, presumably, refectory - 1810), the earliest of the preserved architectural monuments in Yuryevets,

Church of the Presentation of the Lord (1757, Baroque),

Church of the Nativity of Christ (1815, Baroque), the courtyard of the St. Nicholas-Tikhon Monastery,

Church of the Descent of the Holy Spirit (1839, cemetery),

Church of the Beheading of John the Baptist,

Church of the Feodorovskaya Icon of the Mother of God,

the building of the former linen factory of A. V. Bryukhanov (1870-1790s),

the building of the former brewery of Krasilnikov and Bobylev (1880),

the treasury building (end of the 17th century), Sovetskaya str., 105

Gorodo-Mindovsky School (1879),

men's gymnasium (1909, architect M. N. Cherkassky),

women's gymnasium named after A. S. Pushkin, then secondary school No. 1, in disrepair (opened on May 26, 1899)

V. N. Demidov's restaurant (1910s, elements of Art Nouveau; demolished in the 1970s),

the building of the city council (1913, Neoclassical architecture),

wooden merchant's warehouse,

residential buildings of the 19th - early 20th centuries, including the brick house of V. N. Demidov (end of the 19th century), the wooden houses of M. N. Cherkassky (1909), Efimov (1910s) and Litsov's House (1904) (Sovetskaya str., 153),

earthen ramparts preserved from the White Town (1660s).

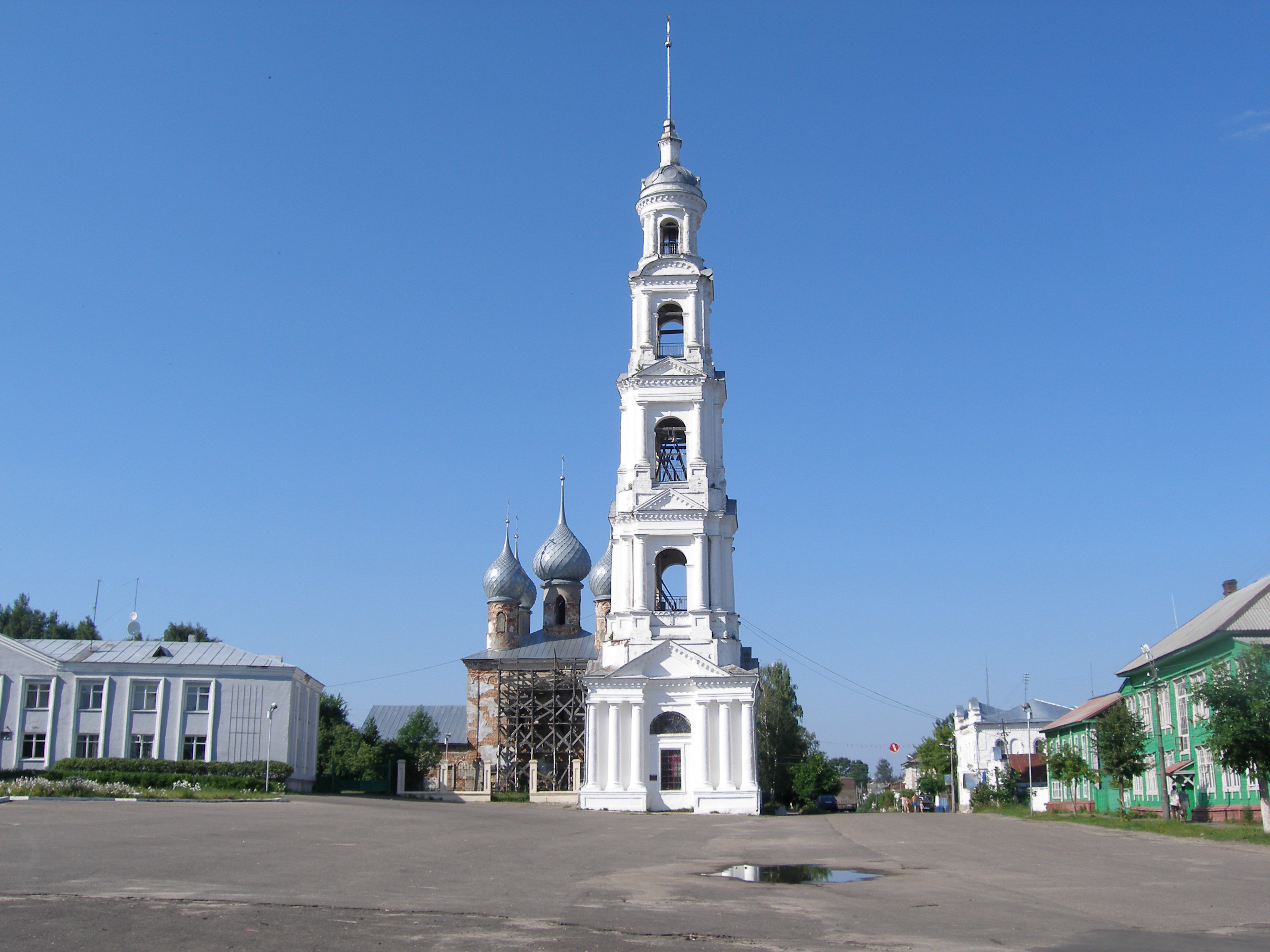
Georgievskaya Square

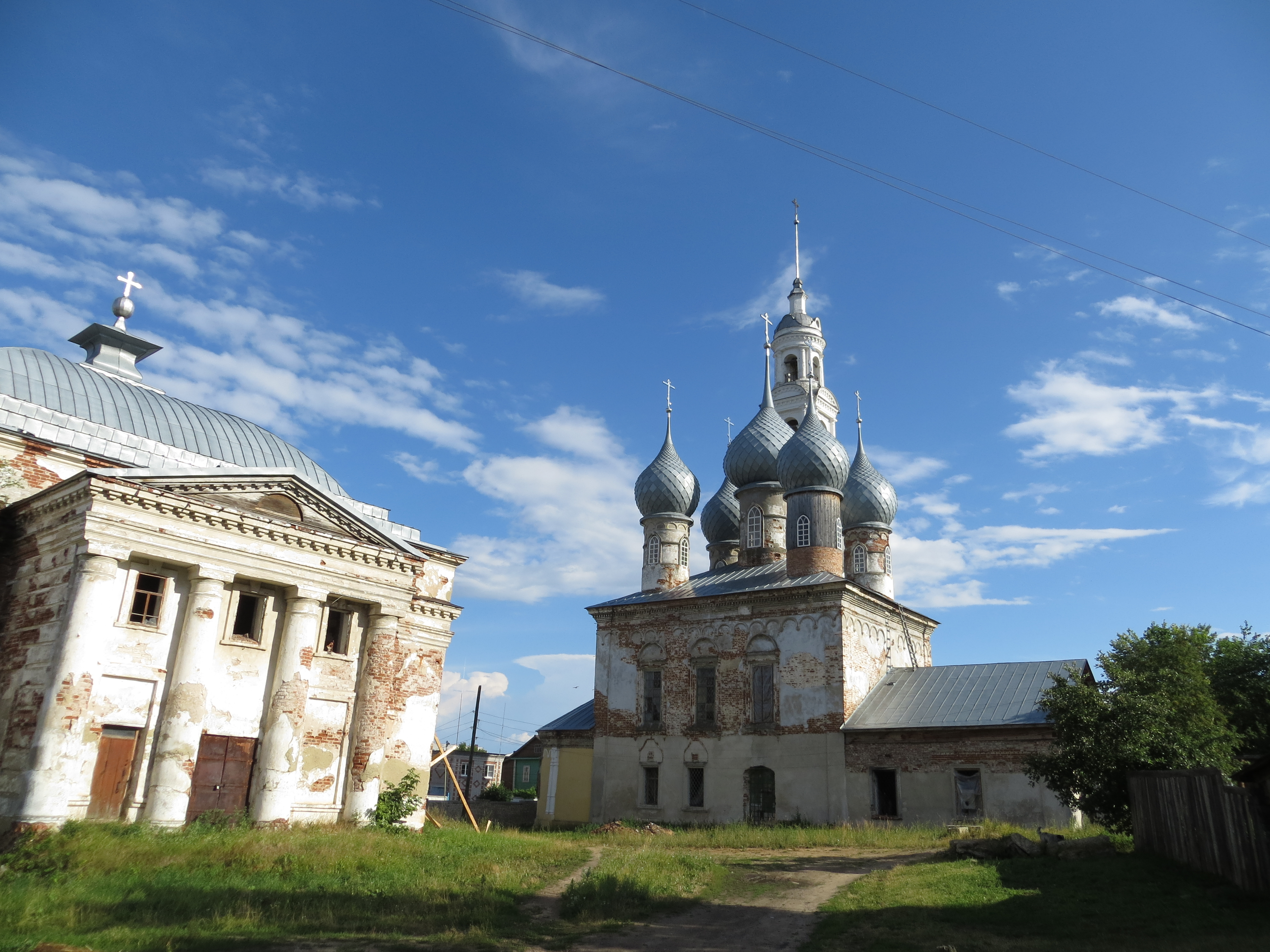
Cathedral ensemble (1733 and later)

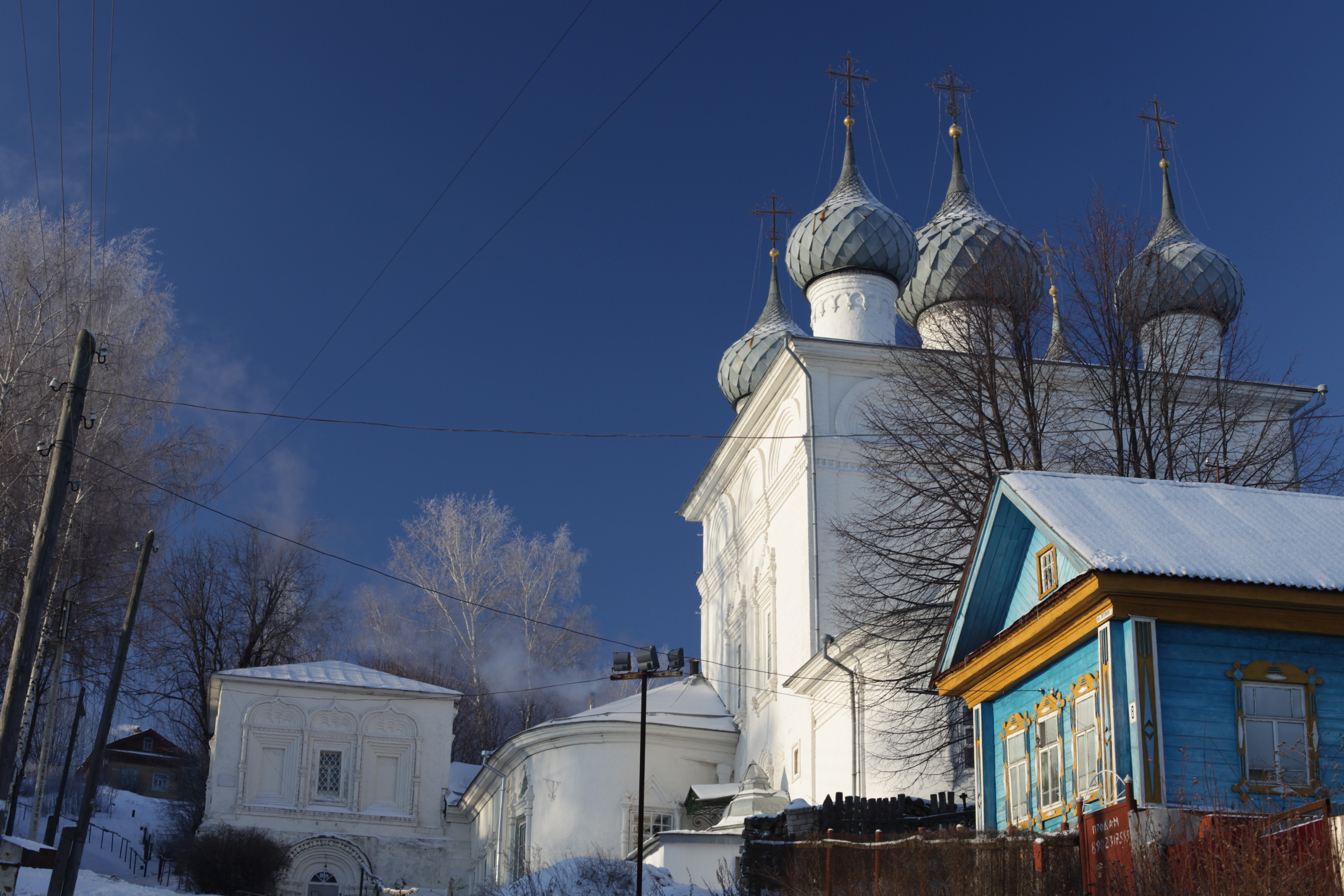
Church of the Epiphany (about 1720)

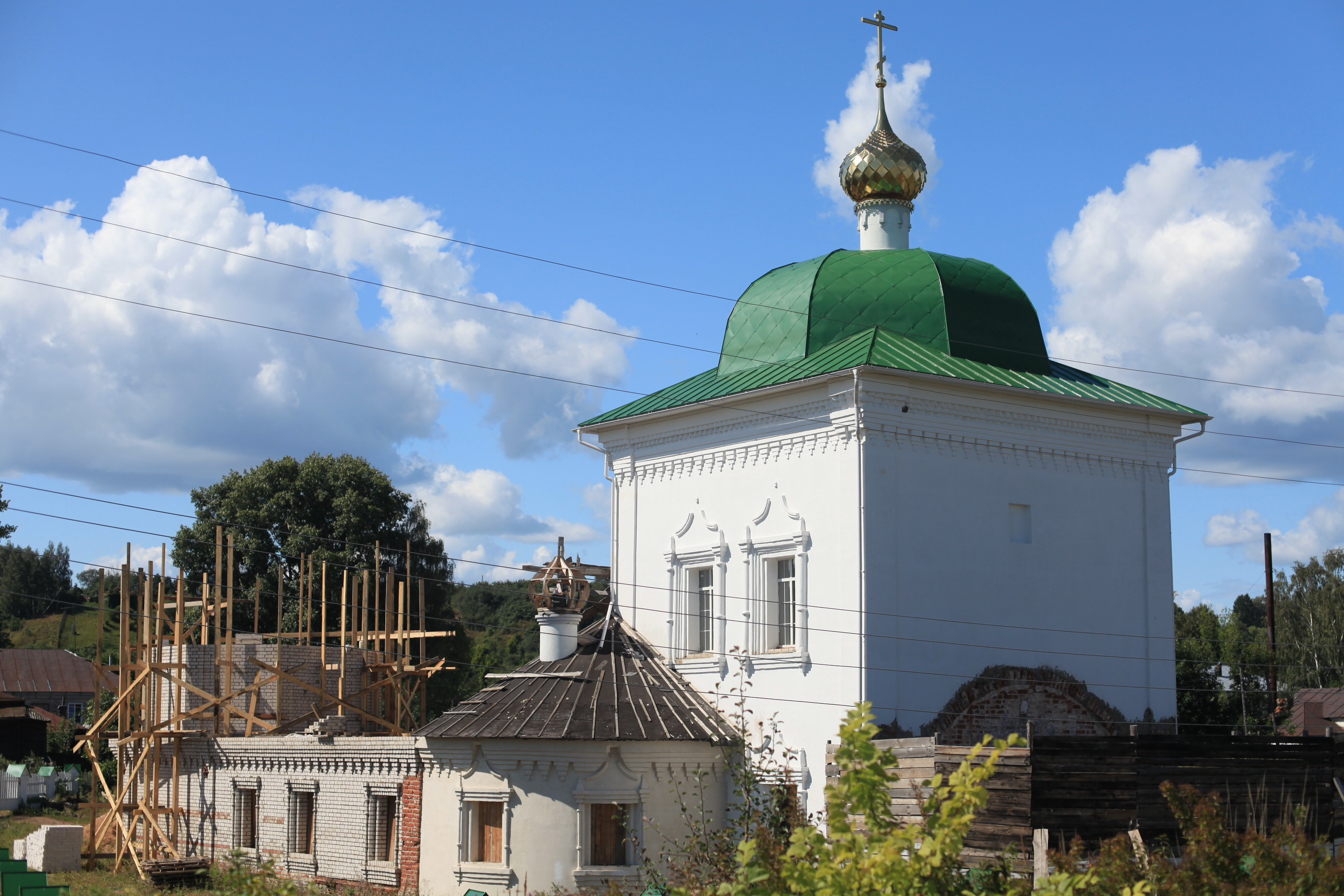
Church of the Presentation of the Lord (1757)

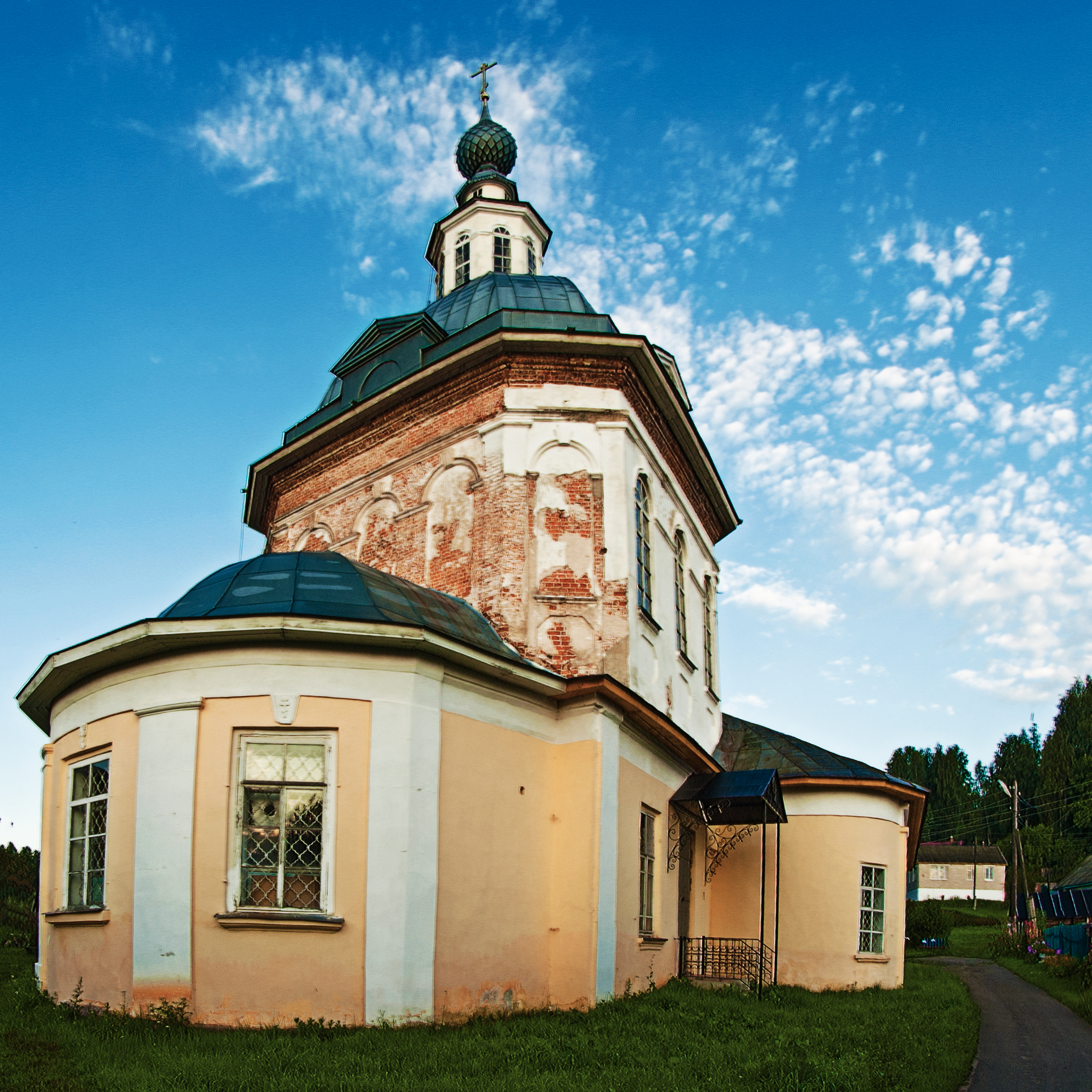
Church of the Nativity of Christ (1815)

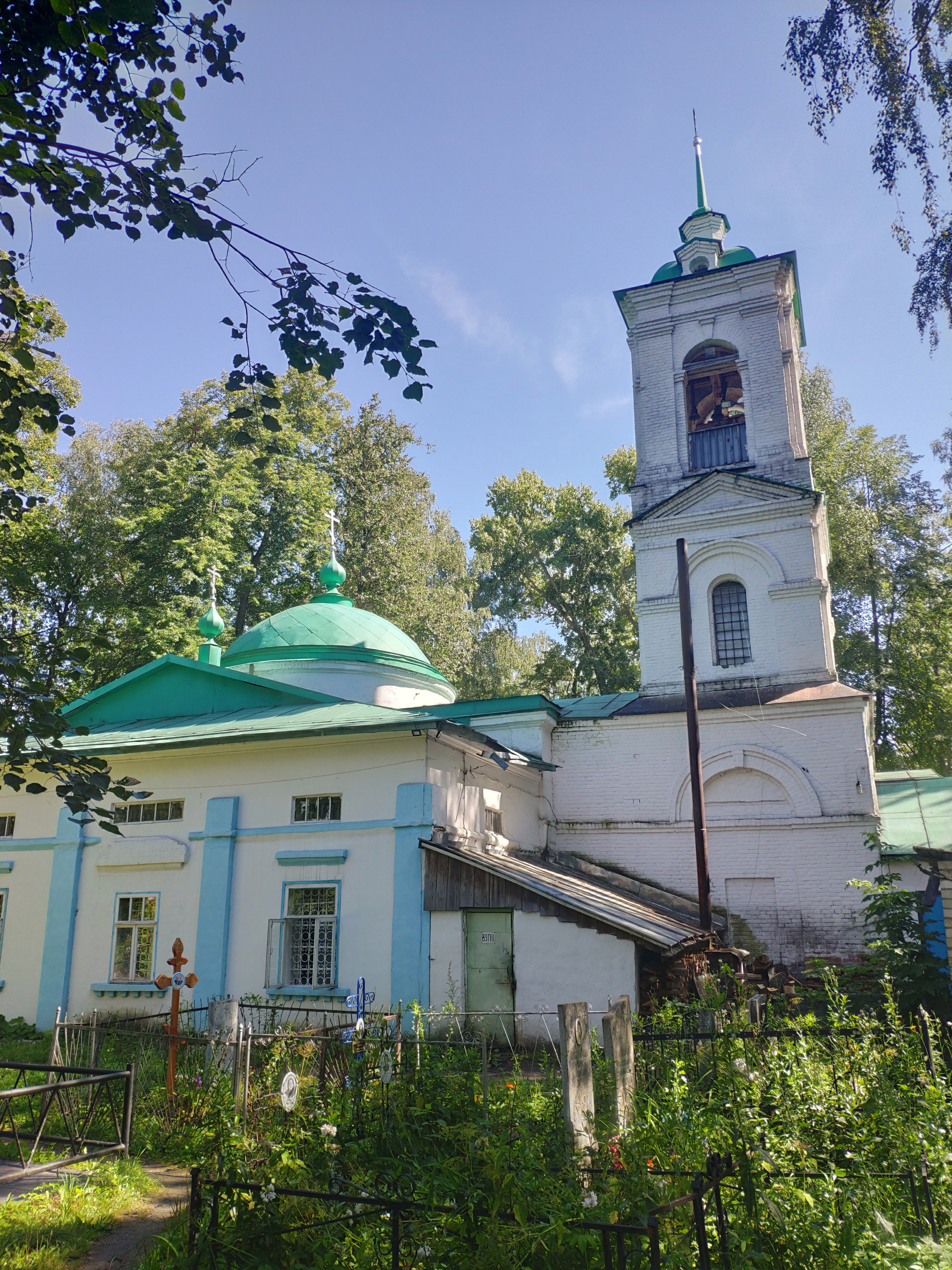
Church of the Descent of the Holy Spirit (1839)

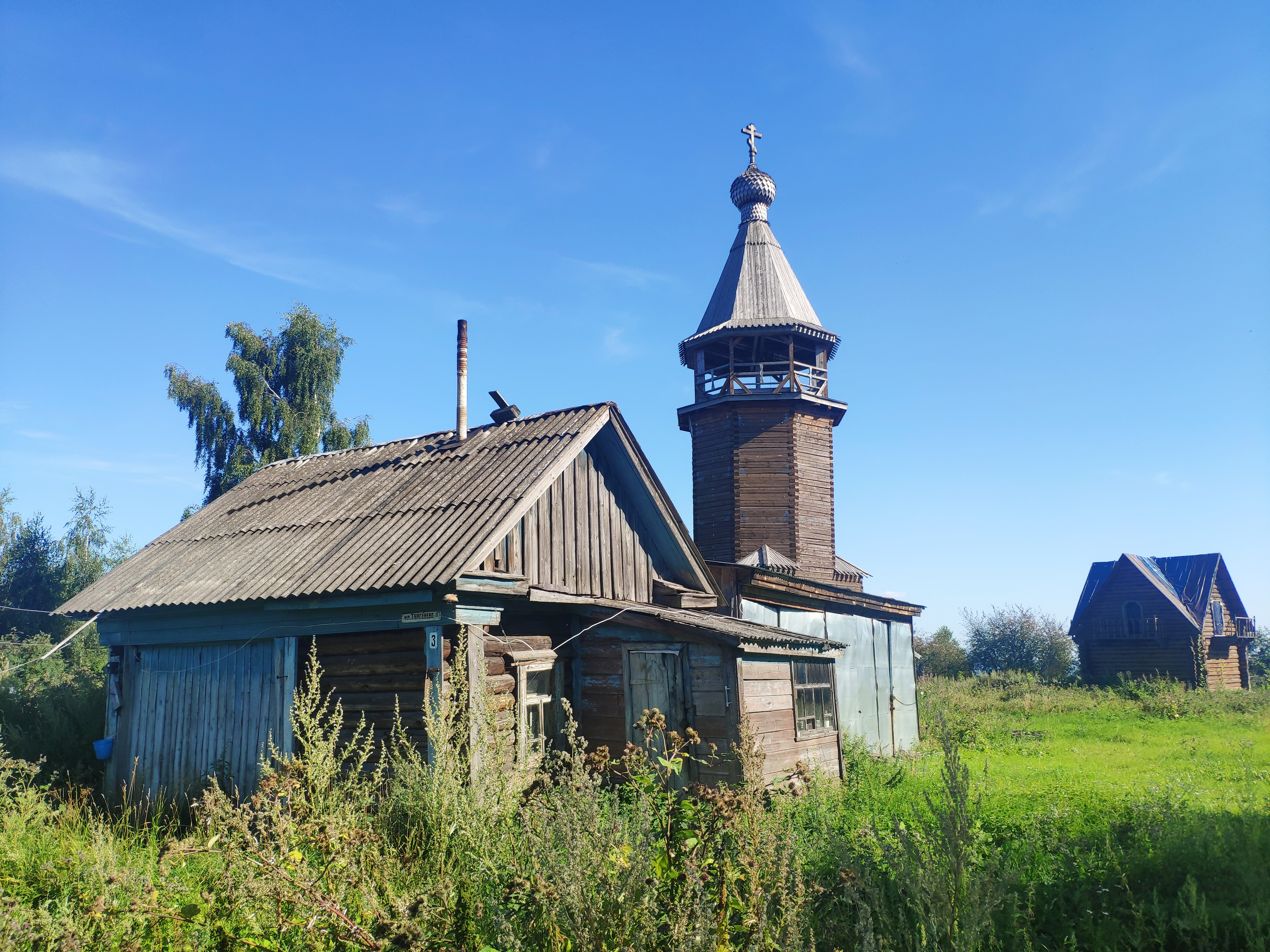
Church of the Nativity of the Blessed Virgin Mary

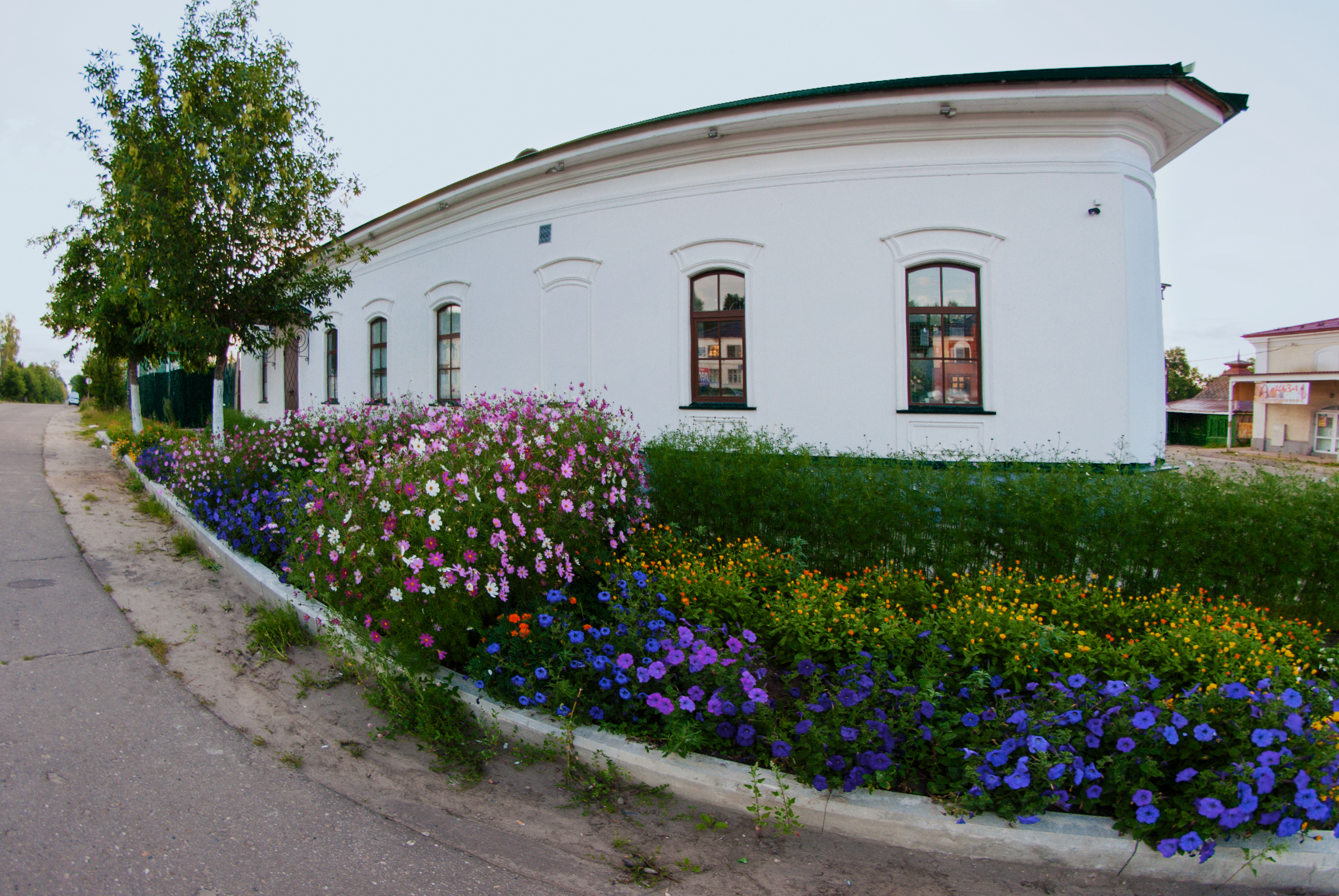
Drinking house (before 1779)

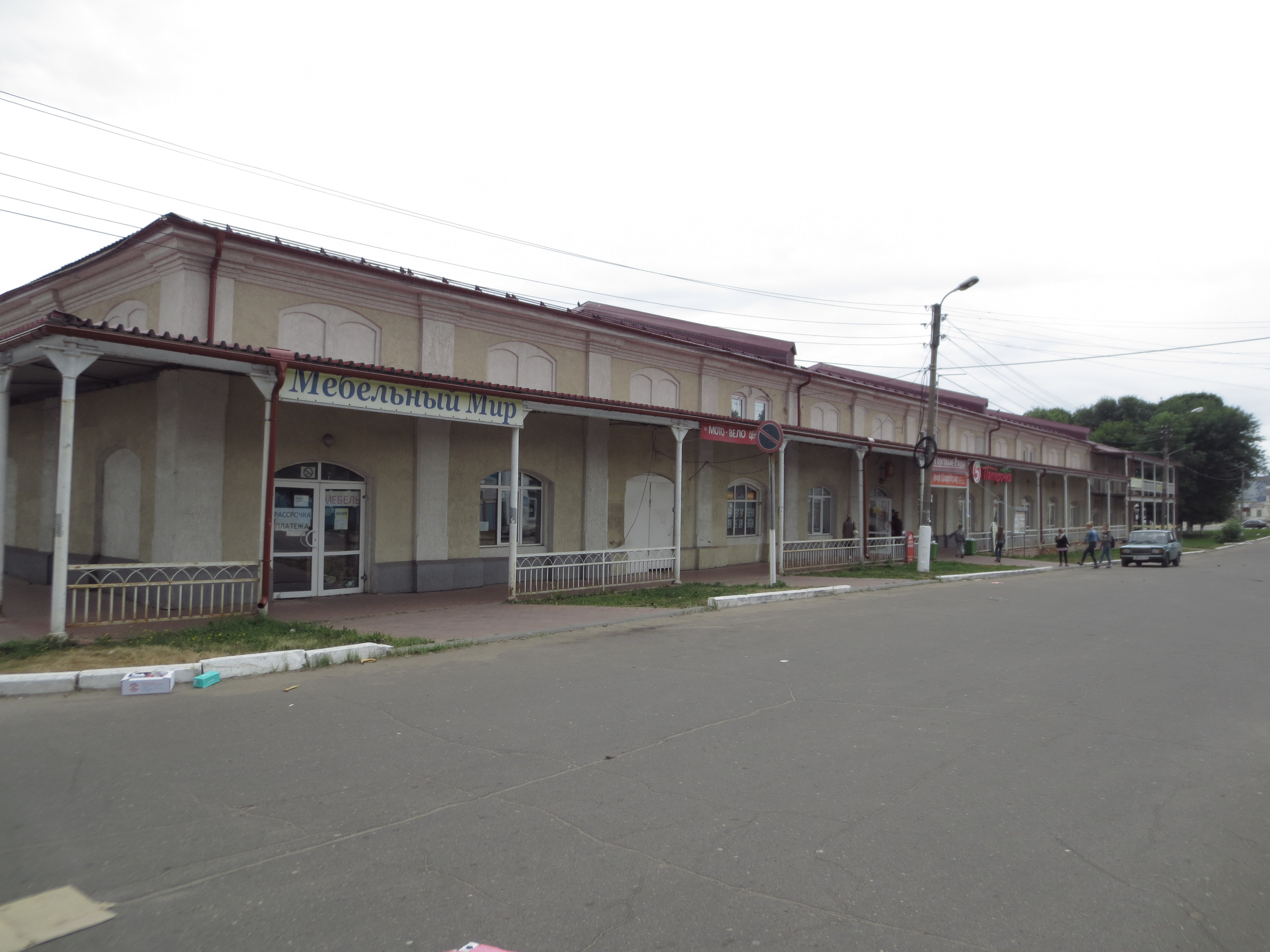
Shopping arcades (third quarter of the 19th century)

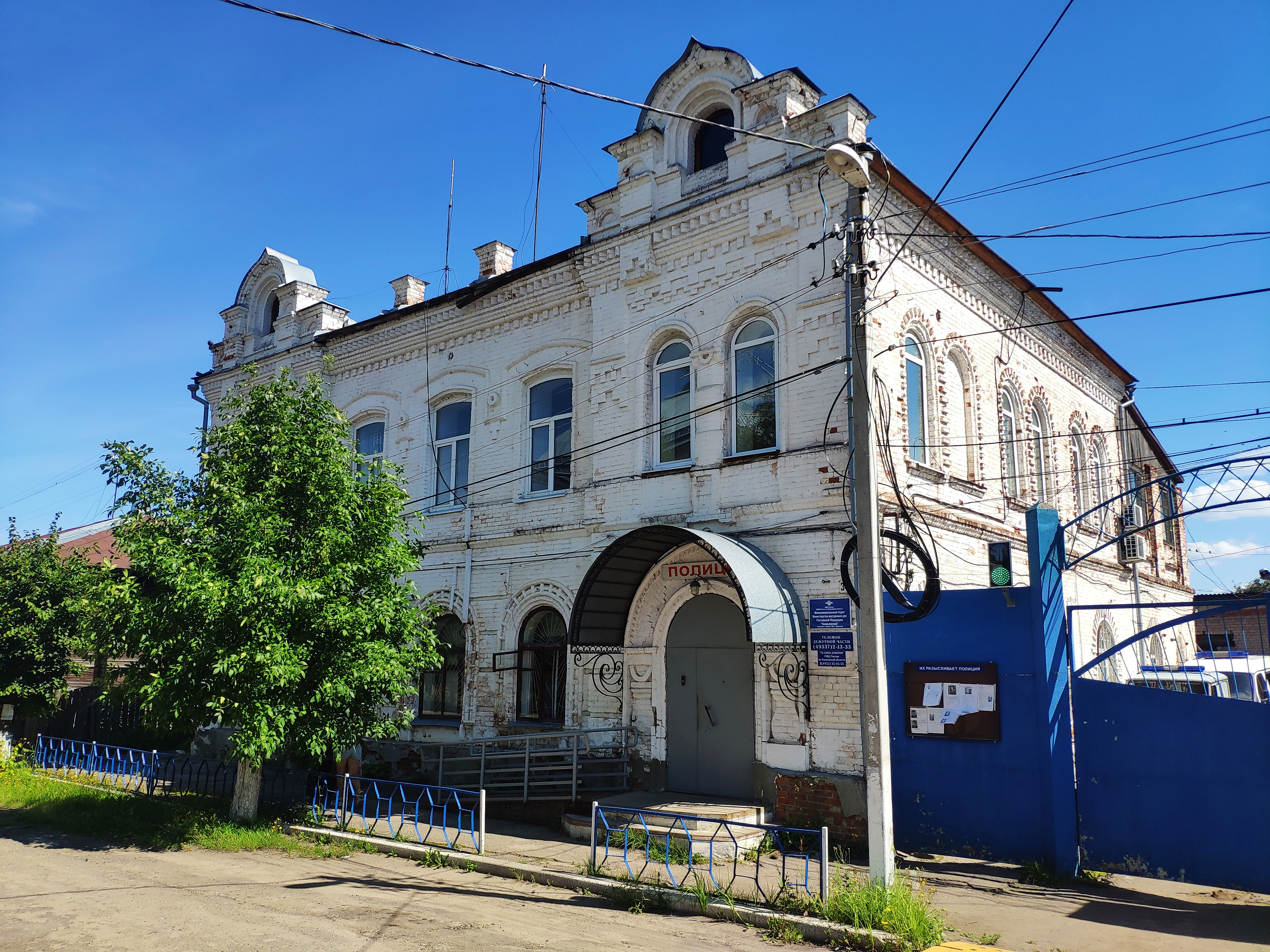
Gorokhov House (19th century)

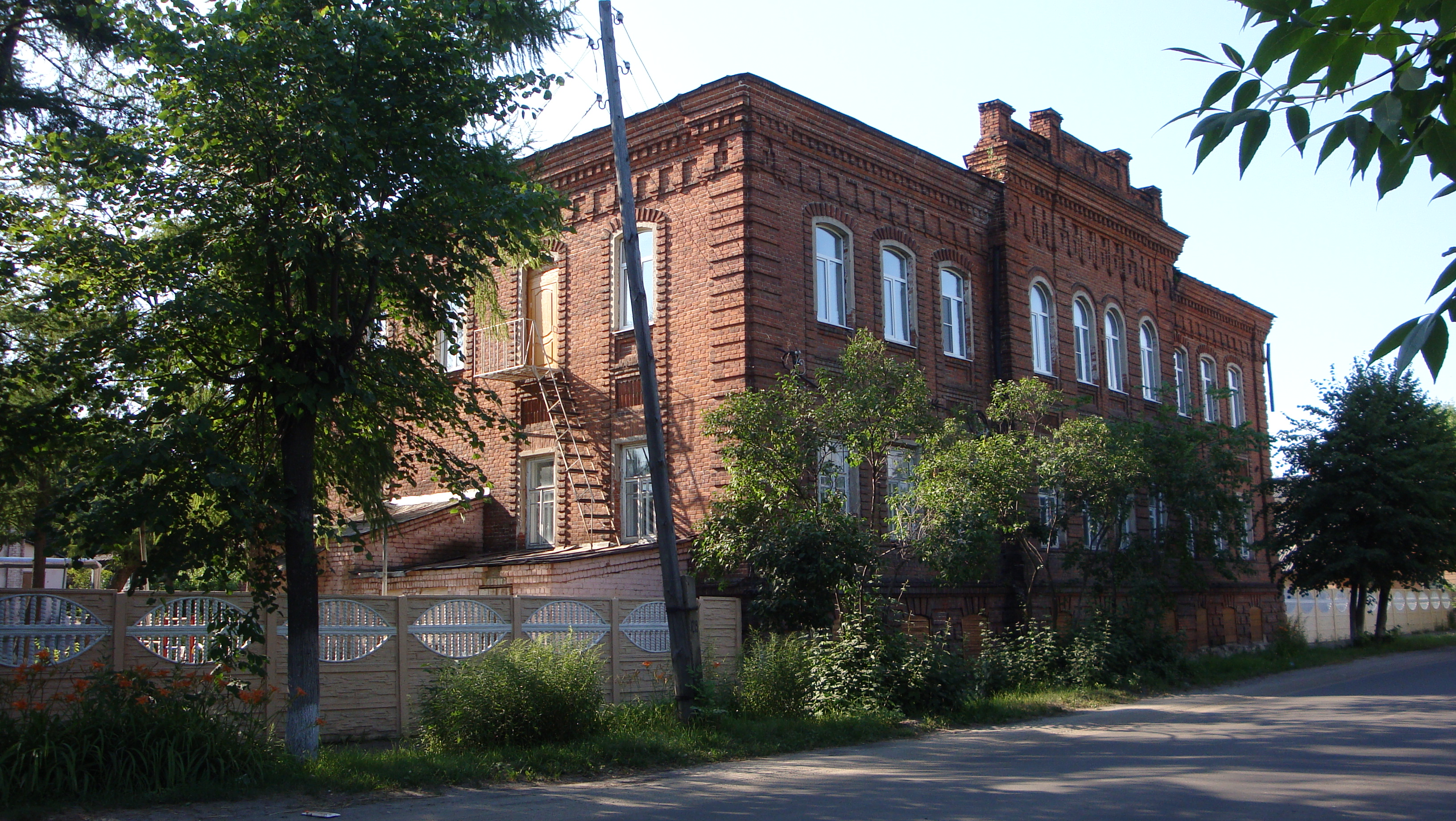
P. Mindovsky School (1904)

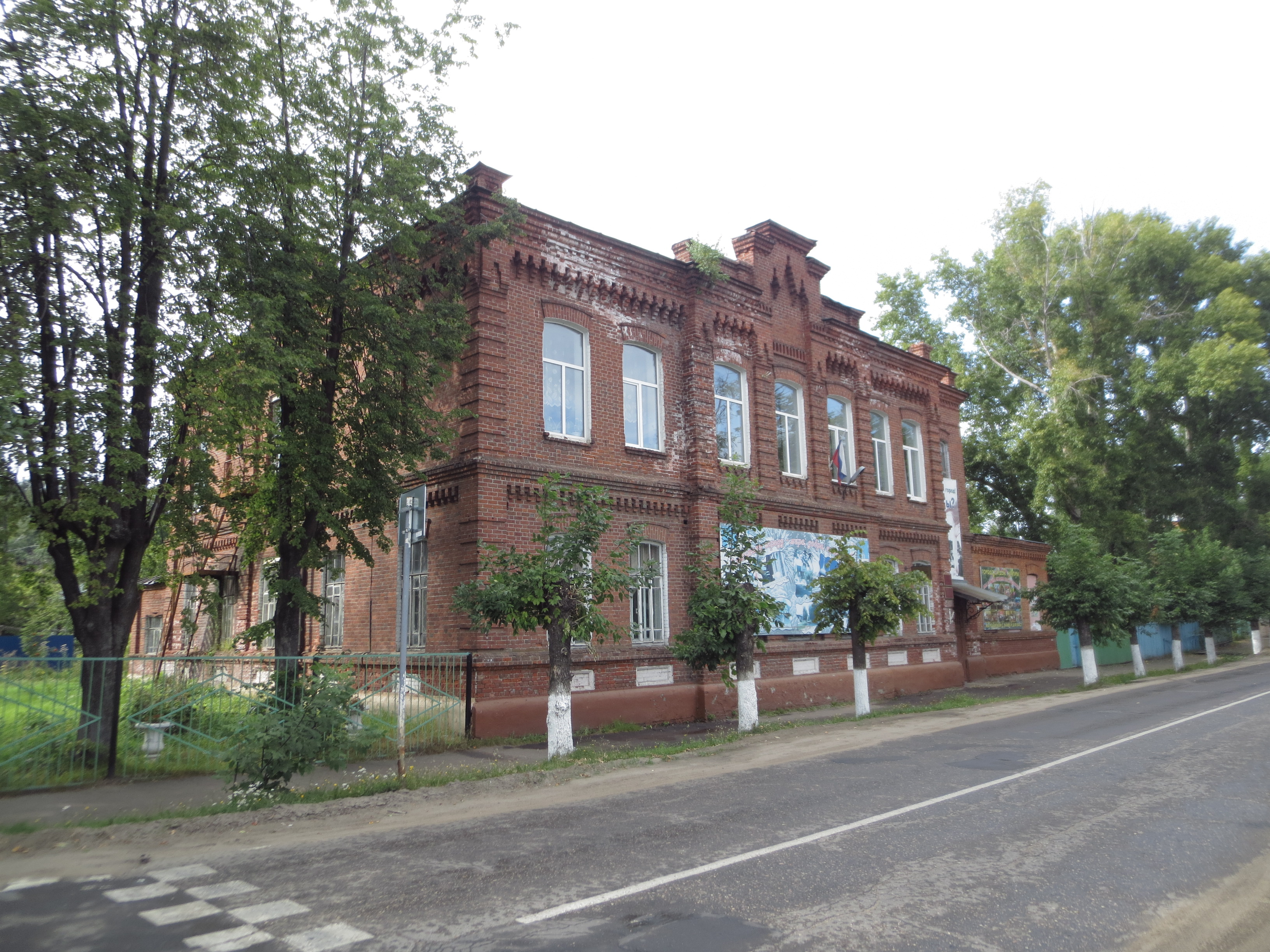
Men's Gymnasium (1909)

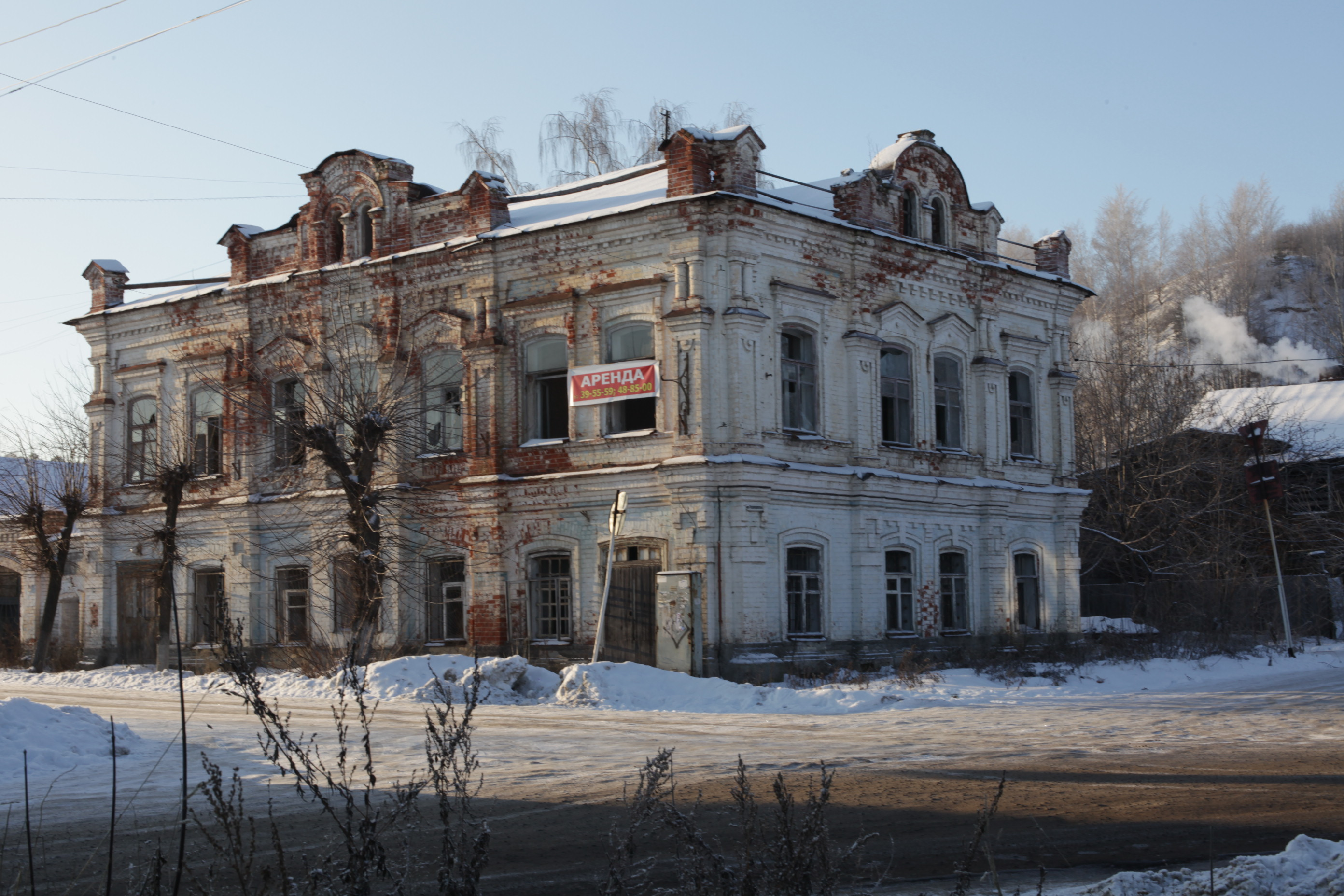
V. N. Demidov's House (1910s)

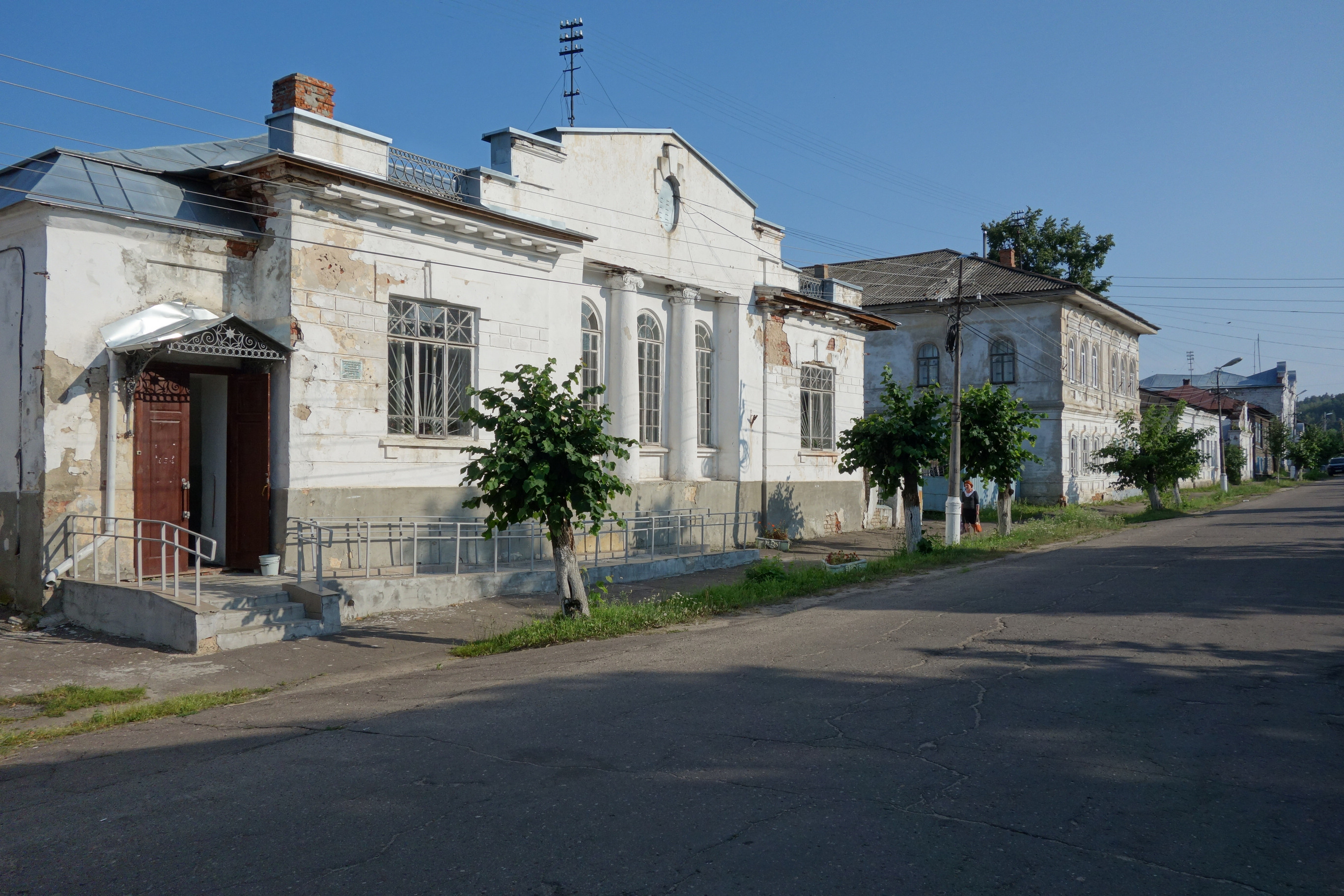
City Council (1913)

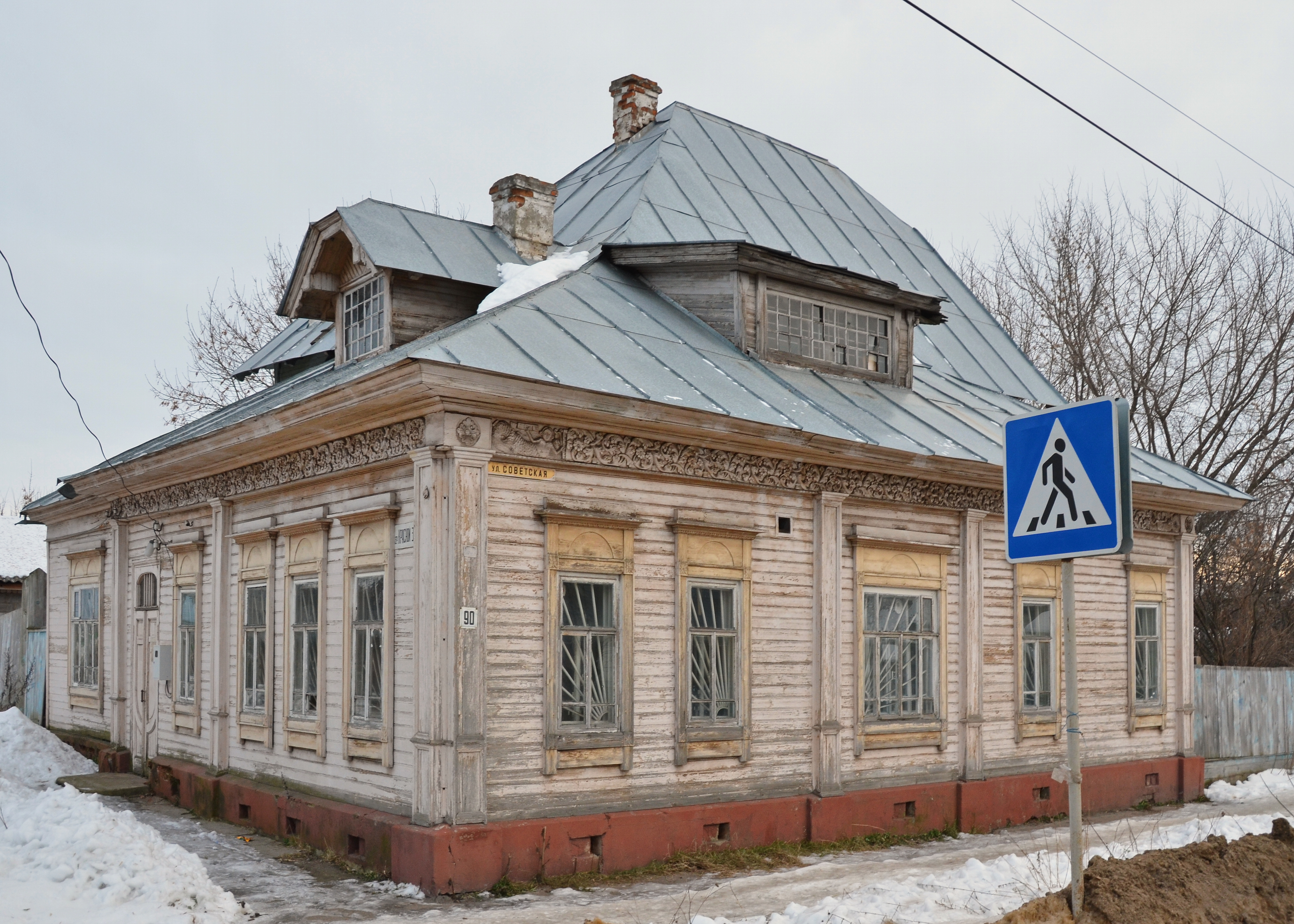
M. N. Cherkassky's House (1909)

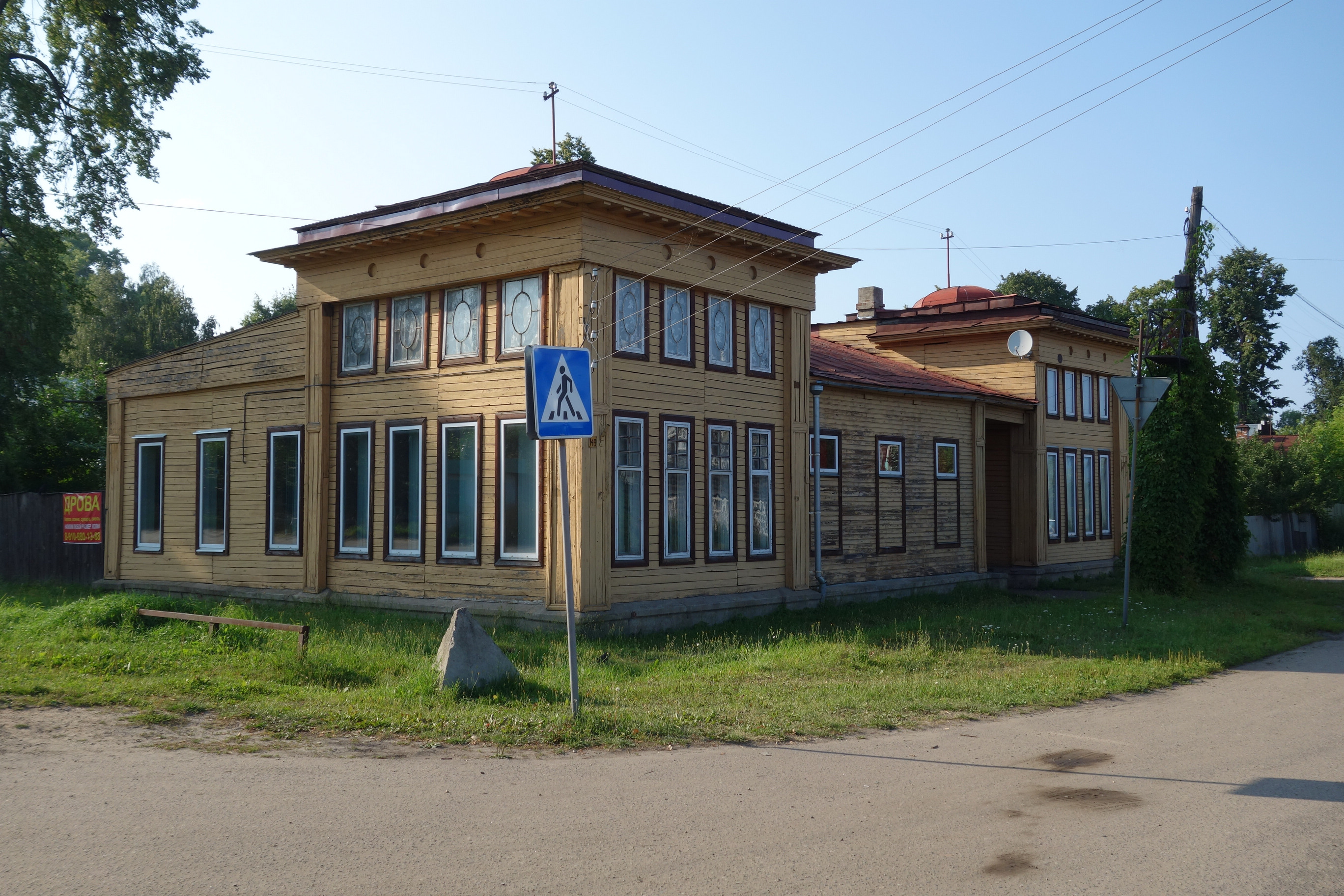
Efimov House (1910s)

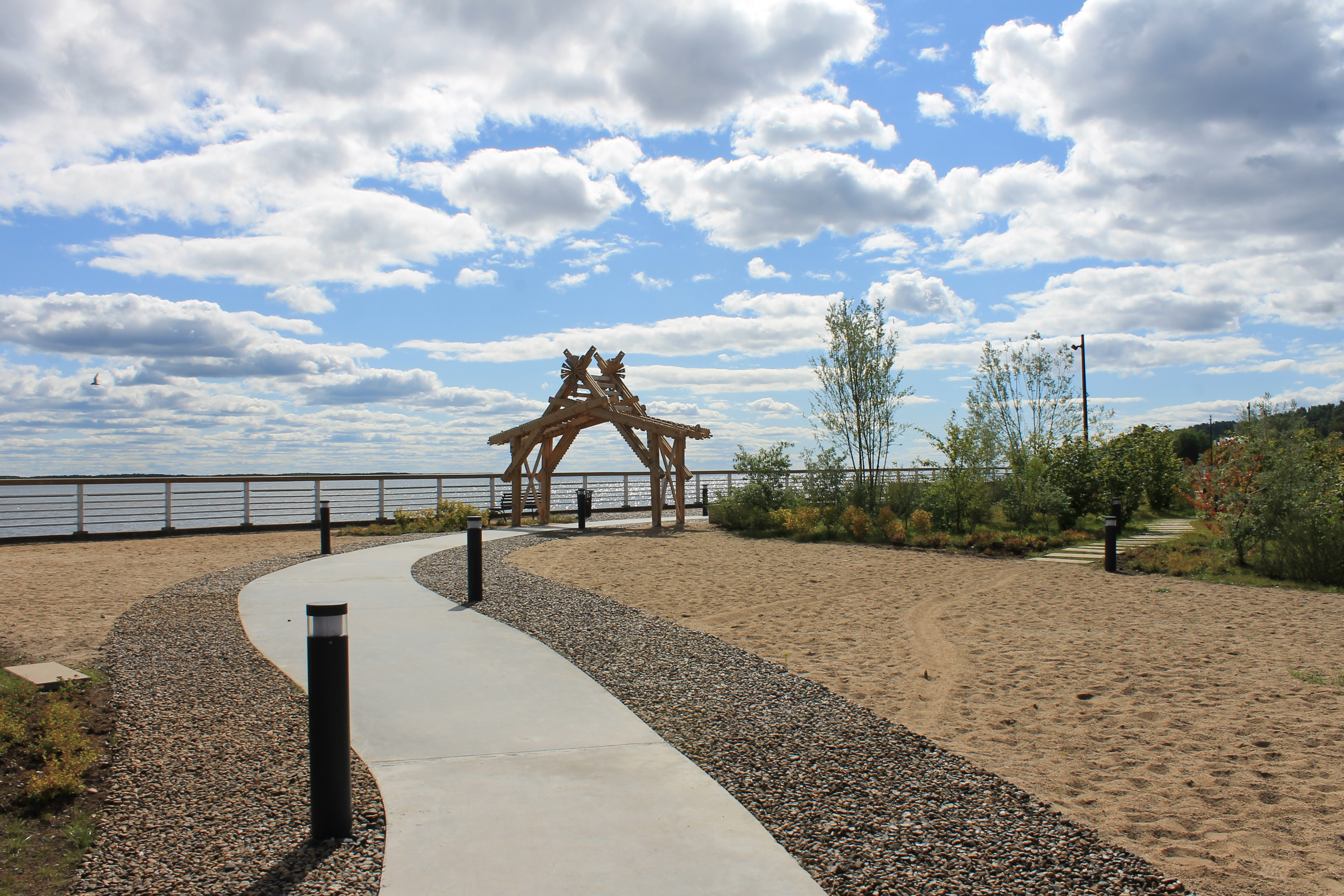
Park on the embankment

== Natural attractions ==
Natural monument "Nagornaya Dacha", a town forest with a total area of 635 hectares on the western side of Yuryevets. 150 hectares of the Nagornaya Dacha forest were planted manually (part of it was grown from seeds), mainly in the post-war period. Most of the trees are pines and spruces, but there are also birches, oaks, maples, ash, poplars, etc. The average age of trees is 89 years, there are specimens whose age exceeds 100 years, and some long-livers are about 200 years old. "Nagornaya Dacha" is experiencing an environmental crisis. The forest suffers from spontaneous garbage dumps, the mass recreation of local residents and guests of the town has led to the pollution of the forest with household waste, new bonfires appear, and illegal logging of valuable tree species is widespread. In 2020, the passport of the natural monument of the Ivanovo Oblast "Yuryevets National Dacha" was approved and its area was reduced. A large area of forest plantations was damaged by a hurricane on May 15, 2021. In 2023, continuous and selective sanitary felling is being carried out.

Asafovy Islands is an artificially created archipelago located 4 km from Yuryevets, consisting of five sandy islands with a length of 4 km and an area of 65 km^{2} (25 sq mi). The islands were formed after the flooding of the area - Asafova (Osapova) Gora. In 2005, the islands became a specially protected natural area of the Yuryevets district. Now the Asafovy Islands are a popular tourist destination in the Ivanovo Oblast.

Glazovaya Gora is an elevated area within the town of Yuryevets, notable for its steep cliffs overlooking the Volga River and the Asafovy Islands..

Gorky Reservoir, a reservoir on the Volga River, formed by the dam of the Nizhny Novgorod Hydroelectric Station. Due to its size, as well as due to storms with a wave height of more than 2 meters, it has the common name Gorky Sea. It is part of the Volga Cascade of Reservoirs.

The Spring of Simon the Blessed is named after the Saint Simon Yuryevetsky. A wooden chapel was built on the site of the spring. Pilgrims from various regions come to the spring of Saint Simon. There are about 5 springs with clean artesian water in the town.

== Museums and monuments ==
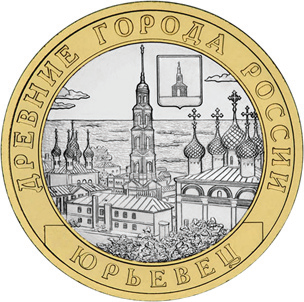
Commemorative coin of the Central Bank of Russia with a face value of 10 rubles (2010), from the series Ancient cities of Russia (coins)

The town has an association "Museums of the Town of Yuryevets" (1997), which includes:

Historical and Art Museum (1925, located in the mansion of A. L. Flyagin),

Museum of Architects the Vesnin brothers, natives of Yuryevets (1986, in a 19th-century house, which until 1904 belonged to their parents),

Andrei Tarkovsky Museum Center (1996, in a house of the early 20th century, in which the future director lived with his grandmother in 1941-1943),

Andrei Tarkovsky Cultural Center (2011) Also in the town are:

Yuryevets Museum of Public Education (1996),

House of Fairy Tales of Alexander Rou (2017),

Puppet Theater-Museum "Istoki" (1996),

Museum "Skazkino".

Two kilometers from Yuryevets, in the water area of the Gorky Reservoir, a 12-meter-high worship cross was installed in memory of the Krivoezersky Monastery and all the lost churches of Yuryevets (2000). On Pyatnitskaya Gora there is a memorial complex dedicated to the Great Patriotic War and a chapel. In the southern part of the town, 15 meters from the shore, there is a cross in memory of the destroyed Kazan Church.

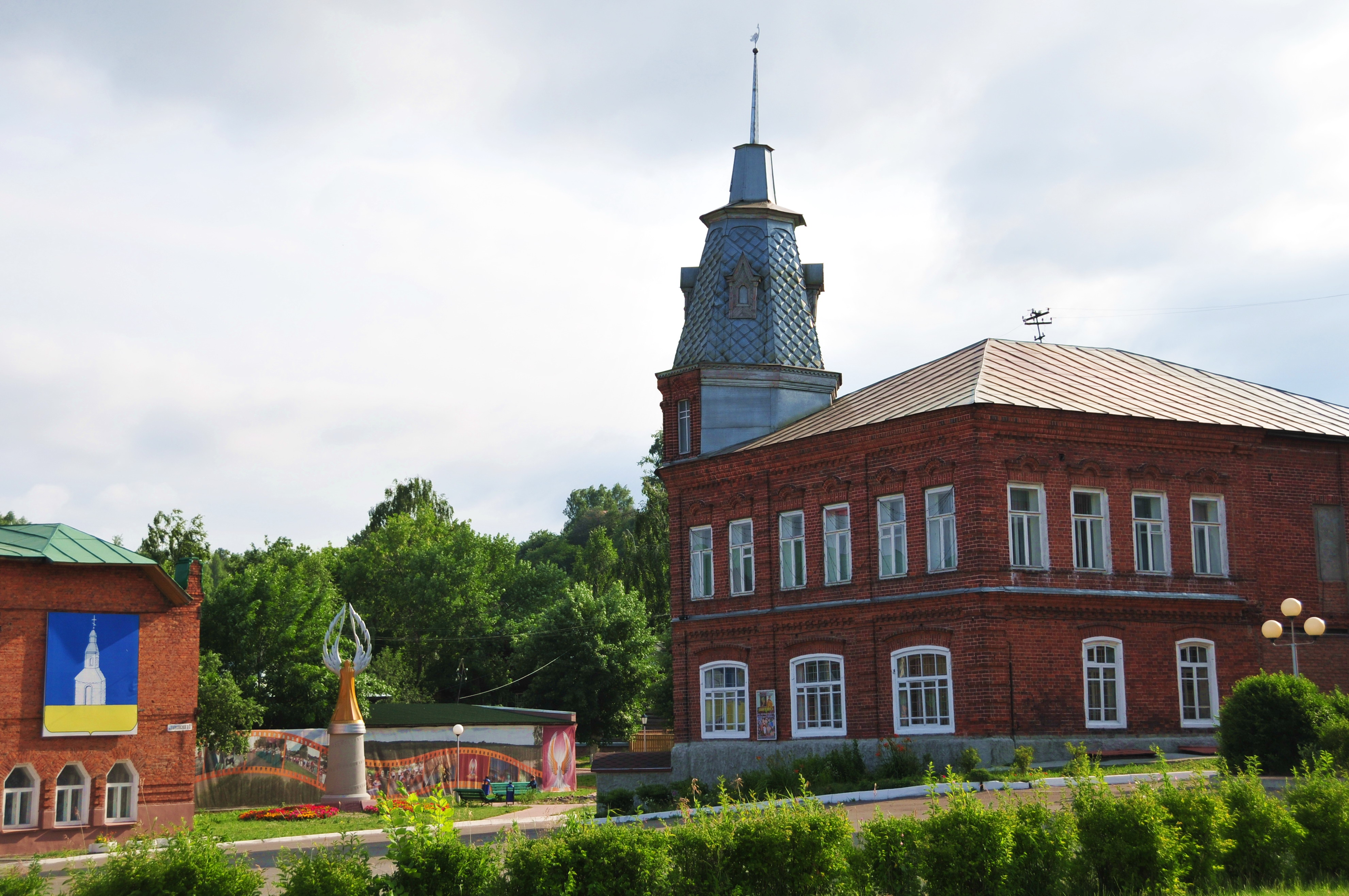
Mansion of the city head A. L. Flyagin (1903), now the Historical and Art Museum

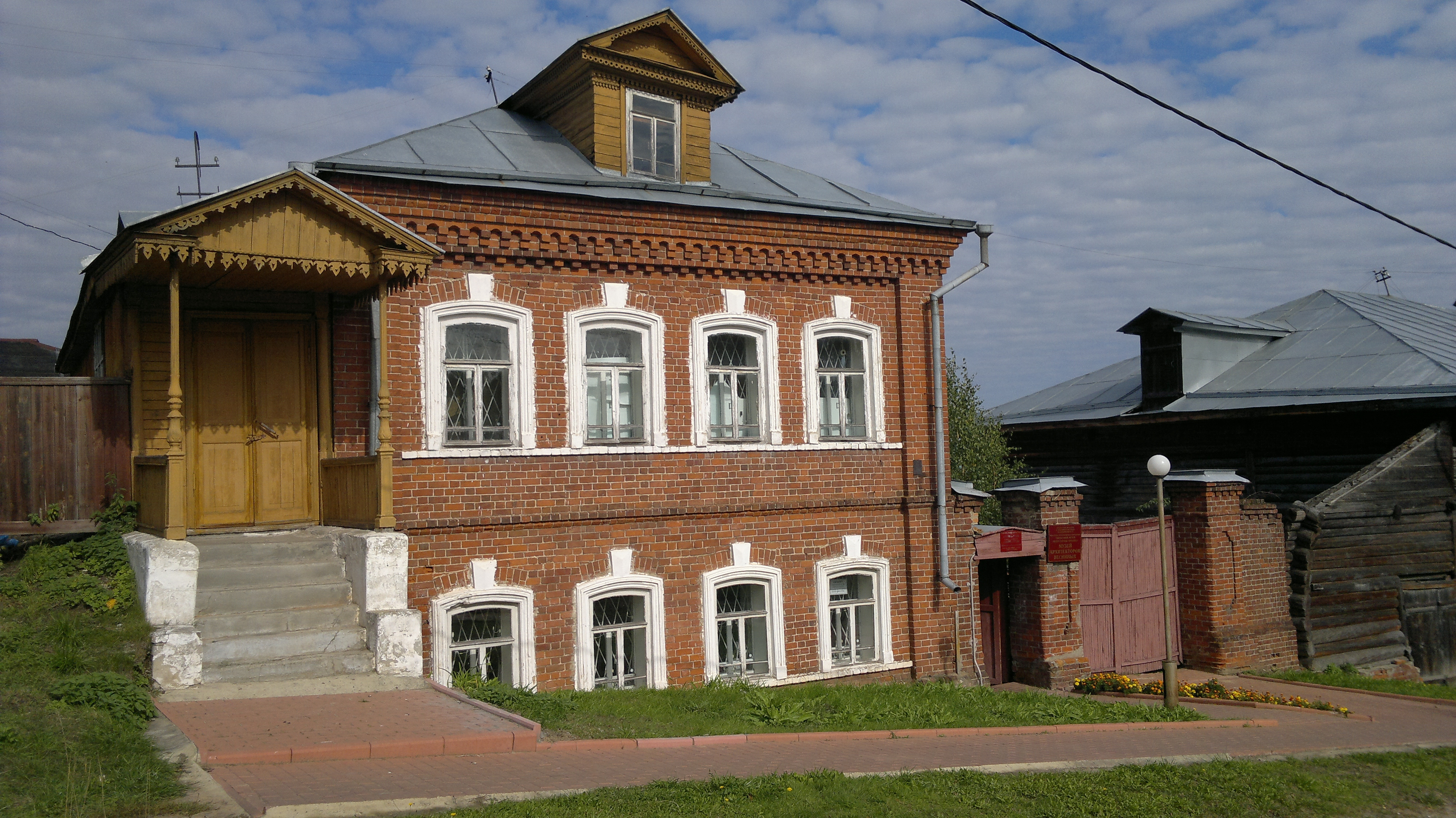
Museum of architects the Vesnin brothers

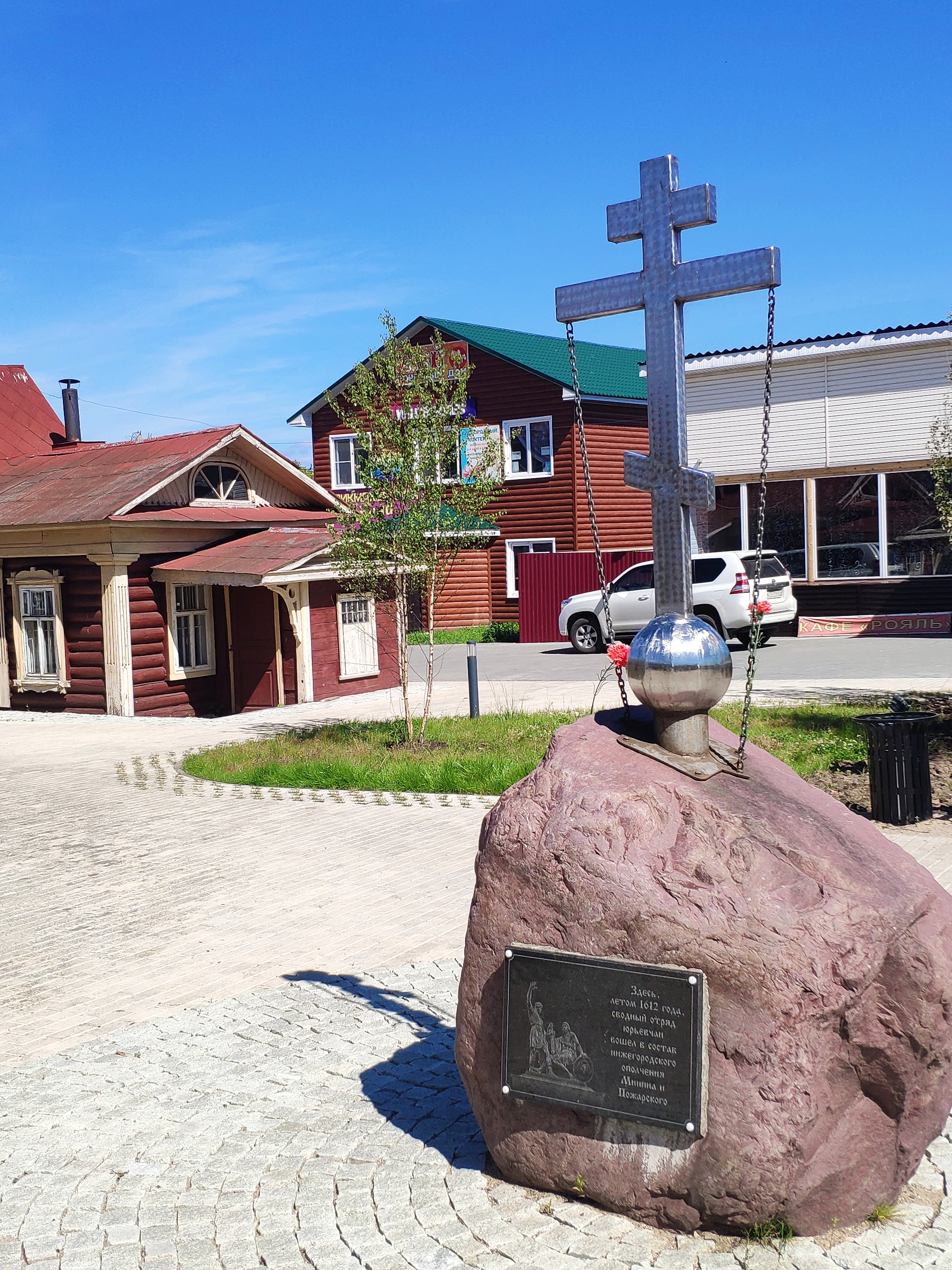
Memorial sign. Trading square, where in 1612 a combined detachment of Yuryevets residents joined the militia of Minin and Pozharsky

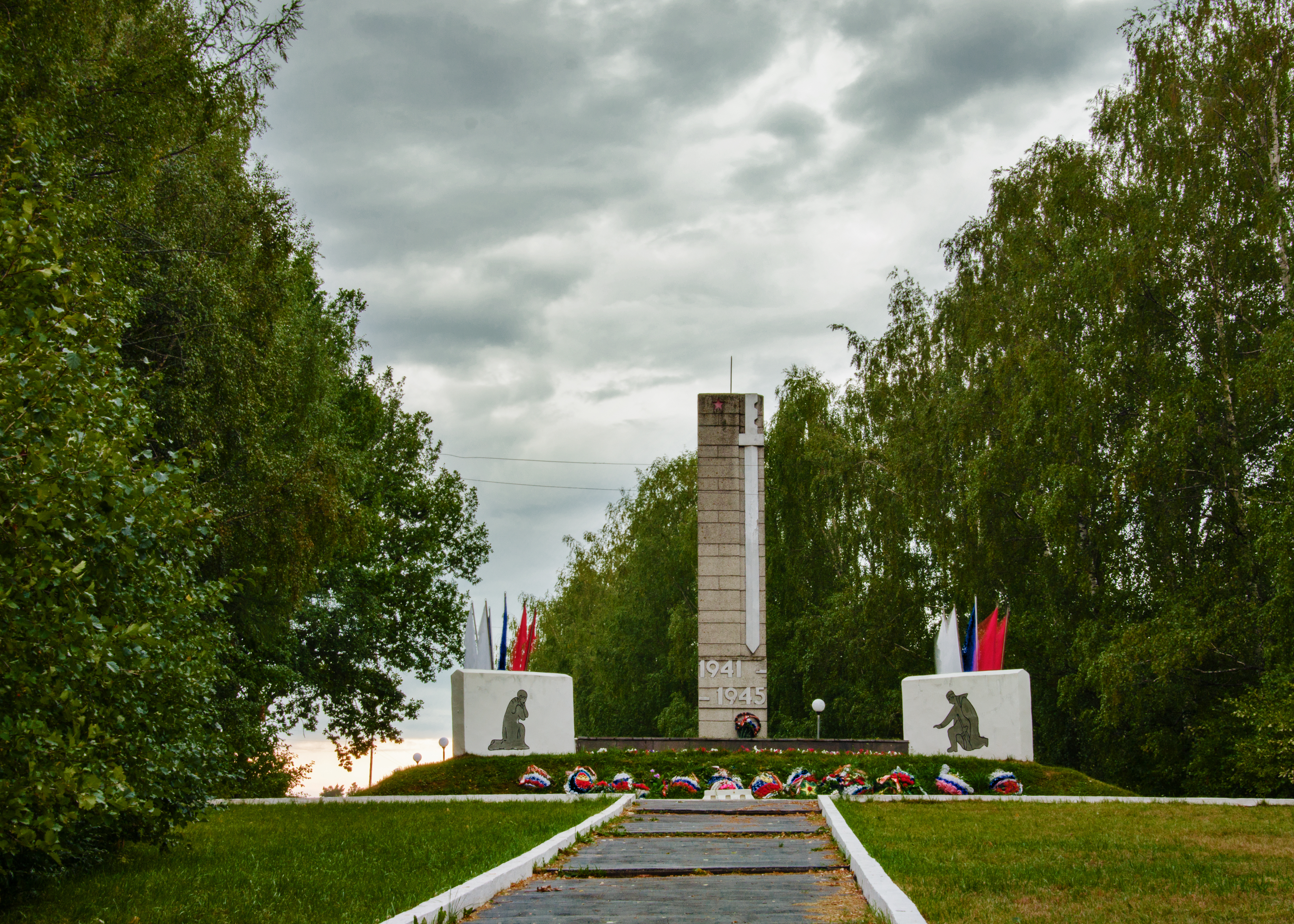
Part of the memorial complex dedicated to the Great Patriotic War

== Honorary citizens ==
Vladimirov Boris Alekseevich (29.01.1937 - 15.11.2012) - scientist, local historian.

Vladimirova Elizaveta Alekseevna (17.10.1907 - 26.10.2002) - teacher.

Glotova Klavdiya Pavlovna - physician.

Gruzdev Sergey Sergeevich - volleyball coach

Zinin Lev Gennadievich - headed the Yuryevets woodworking plant.

Lantsov Nikolai Aleksandrovich - head of the veterans' choir.

Mindovsky Ivan Aleksandrovich - Yuryevets merchant of the 1st guild, a major forest owner and house owner.

Mindovsky Alexander Ivanovich - founder of the Yuryevets flax spinning manufactory of Mindovsky, Bryukhanov and Bakakin.

Polyakova Larisa Lvovna - journalist and local historian.

Rassokhatskaya Galina Pavlovna - physician, public figure.

Sirotina Alexandra Vasilievna (27.03.1930 - 22.07.2019) - creator of the Museum of Public Education.

Skritskaya Valentina Vladimirovna - pediatrician.

Talova Albina Ivanovna - public figure, headed the society for the blind, KBO.

Andrei Tarkovsky - Soviet film director and screenwriter

Foteichev Alexander Valentinovich - teacher, public figure, inspirer of the creation of the Children's Music School in Yuryevets.

Shalnov Anatoly Ivanovich (1943-2018) - prosecutor, public figure.

== Culture ==
Town Day and district in Yuryevets is celebrated annually on the first Saturday of August.

Andrei Tarkovsky Days are held on April 4.

On May 6, Yuryevets residents take part in a procession on the day of remembrance of the holy great martyr George the Victorious.

On May 23, an archierarchical service is held, dedicated to the blessed Simon of Yuryevets.

The group from Yuryevets "Luka and the winds" has repeatedly participated in the Ivanovo festival Rock-February. For participation, it was awarded diplomas. The group itself held the festival "Burlatskaya Stolitsa".

In summer, Yuryevets hosts the opening of the annual international film festival "Mirror" named after Andrei Tarkovsky (2007). Creative meetings and film screenings are held at the Andrei Tarkovsky Cultural Center. The main events take place in Ivanovo.

The All-Russian festival "Fisherman - Fisherman" and the sailing regatta for the prize "Cup of the Governor of the Ivanovo Oblast" were held in August.

== Sport ==
In 1987, the "Club of Young Sailors" was opened for children to practice sailing. In 2014, the club was closed due to lack of funding. Since 2015, the "Sail" association has been working at the children's and youth center of additional education. Until 2017, an interregional rally of young sailors' clubs was held (July–August). There is a motocross track where competitions for athletes of different categories are held.

There is a sports section on Pankration. A beach volleyball tournament is held annually on the Asafovy Islands and in early May an athletics relay race "Path of Victory".

== Media ==
The only media in the district is the newspaper Volga.

Also catches Road Radio - Makaryev 102.6 FM.
