= Yuryevetsky =

Yuryevetsky (masculine), Yuryevetskaya (feminine), or Yuryevetskoye (neuter) may refer to:

- Yuryevetsky District, a district of Ivanovo Oblast, Russia
- Yuryevetskoye Urban Settlement, a municipal formation which the town of Yuryevets in Yuryevetsky District of Ivanovo Oblast, Russia is incorporated as
