= Podvyazkino =

Podvyazkino Подвязкино
- Village
- Location within Ivanovo Oblast Location within Russia
- Coordinates: 57°15′N 42°43′E
- Country: Russia
- Region: Ivanovo Oblast
- District: Yuryevetsky District
- Time zone: UTC+3:00

Podvyazkino (Russian: Подвязкино) is a rural locality (a village) in Yuryevetsky District, Ivanovo Oblast, Russia. Population: 5 (2010 census);

== Geography ==
This rural locality is located 24 kilometres (15 mi) from Yuryevets (the district's administrative centre), 110 kilometres (68 mi) from Ivanovo (capital of Ivanovo Oblast) and 349 kilometres (217 mi) from Moscow. Kostyayevo Bolshoye is the nearest rural locality.
