= Prokino, Ivanovo Oblast =

Prokino Прокино
- Village
- Location within Ivanovo Oblast Location within Russia
- Coordinates: 57°15′N 42°40′E
- Country: Russia
- Region: Ivanovo Oblast
- District: Yuryevetsky District
- Time zone: UTC+3:00

Prokino (Russian: Прокино) is a rural locality (a village) in Yuryevetsky District, Ivanovo Oblast, Russia. Population: 5 (2010 census);

== Geography ==
This rural locality is located 27 kilometres (17 mi) from Yuryevets (the district's administrative centre), 107 kilometres (66 mi) from Ivanovo (capital of Ivanovo Oblast) and 347 kilometres (216 mi) from Moscow. Melenka is the nearest rural locality.
