= Lobany =

Lobany Лобаны
- Village
- Location within Ivanovo Oblast Location within Russia
- Coordinates: 57°20′N 43°02′E
- Country: Russia
- Region: Ivanovo Oblast
- District: Yuryevetsky District
- Time zone: UTC+3:00

Lobany (Russian: Лобаны) is a rural locality (a village) in Yuryevetsky District, Ivanovo Oblast, Russia. Population: 278 (2010 census);

== Geography ==
This rural locality is located 5 kilometres (3.1 mi) from Yuryevets (the district's administrative centre), 131 kilometres (81 mi) from Ivanovo (capital of Ivanovo Oblast) and 371 kilometres (231 mi) from Moscow. Tokarevo is the nearest rural locality.
