= Razdyakonikha =

Razdyakonikha Раздьякониха
- Village
- Location within Ivanovo Oblast Location within Russia
- Coordinates: 57°13′N 42°55′E
- Country: Russia
- Region: Ivanovo Oblast
- District: Yuryevetsky District
- Time zone: UTC+3:00

Razdyakonikha (Russian: Раздьякониха) is a rural locality (a village) in Yuryevetsky District, Ivanovo Oblast, Russia. Population: 6 (2010 census);

== Geography ==
This rural locality is located 16 kilometres (9.9 mi) from Yuryevets (the district's administrative centre), 121 kilometres (75 mi) from Ivanovo (capital of Ivanovo Oblast) and 359 kilometres (223 mi) from Moscow. Gar is the nearest rural locality.
