= Churkino Bolshoye =

Churkino Bolshoye Чуркино Большое
- Village
- Location within Ivanovo Oblast Location within Russia
- Coordinates: 57°13′N 42°42′E
- Country: Russia
- Region: Ivanovo Oblast
- District: Yuryevetsky District
- Time zone: UTC+3:00

Churkino Bolshoye (Russian: Чуркино Большое) is a rural locality (a village) in Yuryevetsky District, Ivanovo Oblast, Russia. Population: 8 (2010 census);

== Geography ==
This rural locality is located 27 kilometres (17 mi) from Yuryevets (the district's administrative centre), 108 kilometres (67 mi) from Ivanovo (capital of Ivanovo Oblast) and 347 kilometres (216 mi) from Moscow. Ruchey is the nearest rural locality.
