= Novoye Zhukovo =

Novoye Zhukovo Новое Жуково
- Village
- Location within Ivanovo Oblast Location within Russia
- Coordinates: 57°12′N 42°53′E
- Country: Russia
- Region: Ivanovo Oblast
- District: Yuryevetsky District
- Time zone: UTC+3:00

Novoye Zhukovo (Russian: Новое Жуково) is a rural locality (a village) in Yuryevetsky District, Ivanovo Oblast, Russia. Population: 82 (2010 census);

== Geography ==
This rural locality is located 18 kilometres (11 mi) from Yuryevets (the district's administrative centre), 118 kilometres (73 mi) from Ivanovo (capital of Ivanovo Oblast) and 356 kilometres (221 mi) from Moscow. Baranikha is the nearest rural locality.
