= Gar, Ivanovo Oblast =

Gar Гарь
- Village
- Location within Ivanovo Oblast Location within Russia
- Coordinates: 57°13′N 42°55′E
- Country: Russia
- Region: Ivanovo Oblast
- District: Yuryevetsky District
- Time zone: UTC+3:00

Gar (Russian: Гарь) is a rural locality (a village) in Yuryevetsky District, Ivanovo Oblast, Russia. Population: 17 (2010 census);

== Geography ==
This rural locality is located 15 kilometres (9.3 mi) from Yuryevets (the district's administrative centre), 121 kilometres (75 mi) from Ivanovo (capital of Ivanovo Oblast) and 359 kilometres (223 mi) from Moscow. Razdyakonikha is the nearest rural locality.
