= Novlenskoye, Ivanovo Oblast =

Novlenskoye Новленское
- Village
- Location within Ivanovo Oblast Location within Russia
- Coordinates: 57°08′N 42°59′E
- Country: Russia
- Region: Ivanovo Oblast
- District: Yuryevetsky District
- Time zone: UTC+3:00

Novlenskoye (Russian: Новленское) is a rural locality (a selo) in Yuryevetsky District, Ivanovo Oblast, Russia. Population: 302 (2010 census);

== Geography ==
This rural locality is located 21 kilometres (13 mi) from Yuryevets (the district's administrative centre), 123 kilometres (76 mi) from Ivanovo (capital of Ivanovo Oblast) and 359 kilometres (223 mi) from Moscow. Bukharino is the nearest rural locality.
