= Parnikovo =

Parnikovo Парниково
- Village
- Location within Ivanovo Oblast Location within Russia
- Coordinates: 57°17′N 42°45′E
- Country: Russia
- Region: Ivanovo Oblast
- District: Yuryevetsky District
- Time zone: UTC+3:00

Parnikovo (Russian: Парниково) is a rural locality (a village) in Yuryevetsky District, Ivanovo Oblast, Russia. Population: 9 (2010 census);

== Geography ==
This rural locality is located 22 kilometres (14 mi) from Yuryevets (the district's administrative centre), 112 kilometres (70 mi) from Ivanovo (capital of Ivanovo Oblast) and 353 kilometres (219 mi) from Moscow. Zakharikha is the nearest rural locality.
