= Zyablovo =

Zyablovo Зяблово
- Village
- Location within Ivanovo Oblast Location within Russia
- Coordinates: 57°20′N 42°45′E
- Country: Russia
- Region: Ivanovo Oblast
- District: Yuryevetsky District
- Time zone: UTC+3:00

Zyablovo (Russian: Зяблово) is a rural locality (a village) in Yuryevetsky District, Ivanovo Oblast, Russia. Population: 29 (2010 census);

== Geography ==
This rural locality is located 21 kilometres (13 mi) from Yuryevets (the district's administrative centre), 114 kilometres (71 mi) from Ivanovo (capital of Ivanovo Oblast) and 355 kilometres (221 mi) from Moscow. Golodayevo is the nearest rural locality.
