= Kostyayevo Bolshoye =

Kostyayevo Bolshoye Костяево Большое
- Village
- Location within Ivanovo Oblast Location within Russia
- Coordinates: 57°15′N 42°43′E
- Country: Russia
- Region: Ivanovo Oblast
- District: Yuryevetsky District
- Time zone: UTC+3:00

Kostyayevo Bolshoye (Russian: Костяево Большое) is a rural locality (a village) in Yuryevetsky District, Ivanovo Oblast, Russia. Population: 280 (2010 census);

== Geography ==
This rural locality is located 24 kilometres (15 mi) from Yuryevets (the district's administrative centre), 110 kilometres (68 mi) from Ivanovo (capital of Ivanovo Oblast) and 350 kilometres (220 mi) from Moscow. Podvyazkino is the nearest rural locality.
