= Petushikha =

Petushikha Петушиха
- Village
- Location within Ivanovo Oblast Location within Russia
- Coordinates: 57°20′N 42°47′E
- Country: Russia
- Region: Ivanovo Oblast
- District: Yuryevetsky District
- Time zone: UTC+3:00

Petushikha (Russian: Петушиха) is a rural locality (a village) in Yuryevetsky District, Ivanovo Oblast, Russia. Population: 20 (2010 census);

== Geography ==
This rural locality is located 19 kilometres (12 mi) from Yuryevets (the district's administrative centre), 116 kilometres (72 mi) from Ivanovo (capital of Ivanovo Oblast) and 357 kilometres (222 mi) from Moscow. Yelnat is the nearest rural locality.
