= Roshvenskoye =

Roshvenskoye Рошвенское
- Village
- Location within Ivanovo Oblast Location within Russia
- Coordinates: 57°17′N 42°42′E
- Country: Russia
- Region: Ivanovo Oblast
- District: Yuryevetsky District
- Time zone: UTC+3:00

Roshvenskoye (Russian: Рошвенское) is a rural locality (a village) in Yuryevetsky District, Ivanovo Oblast, Russia. Population: 12 (2010 census);

== Geography ==
This rural locality is located 25 kilometres (16 mi) from Yuryevets (the district's administrative centre), 109 kilometres (68 mi) from Ivanovo (capital of Ivanovo Oblast) and 350 kilometres (220 mi) from Moscow. Kamenniki is the nearest rural locality.
