= Lyandikha =

Lyandikha Ляндиха
- Village
- Location within Ivanovo Oblast Location within Russia
- Coordinates: 57°10′N 42°55′E
- Country: Russia
- Region: Ivanovo Oblast
- District: Yuryevetsky District
- Time zone: UTC+3:00

Lyandikha (Russian: Ляндиха) is a rural locality (a village) in Yuryevetsky District, Ivanovo Oblast, Russia. Population: 8 (2010 census);

== Geography ==
This rural locality is located 20 kilometres (12 mi) from Yuryevets (the district's administrative centre), 120 kilometres (75 mi) from Ivanovo (capital of Ivanovo Oblast) and 357 kilometres (222 mi) from Moscow. Likhovskaya is the nearest rural locality.
