= Mokhnevo =

Mokhnevo Мохнево
- Village
- Location within Ivanovo Oblast Location within Russia
- Coordinates: 57°16′N 43°03′E
- Country: Russia
- Region: Ivanovo Oblast
- District: Yuryevetsky District
- Time zone: UTC+3:00

Mokhnevo (Russian: Мохнево) is a rural locality (a village) in Yuryevetsky District, Ivanovo Oblast, Russia. Population: 25 (2010 census);

== Geography ==
This rural locality is located 6 kilometres (3.7 mi) from Yuryevets (the district's administrative centre), 130 kilometres (81 mi) from Ivanovo (capital of Ivanovo Oblast) and 368 kilometres (229 mi) from Moscow. Sobolevo is the nearest rural locality.
