= Maurikha =

Maurikha Мауриха
- Village
- Location within Ivanovo Oblast Location within Russia
- Coordinates: 57°22′N 42°50′E
- Country: Russia
- Region: Ivanovo Oblast
- District: Yuryevetsky District
- Time zone: UTC+3:00

Maurikha (Russian: Мауриха) is a rural locality (a village) in Yuryevetsky District, Ivanovo Oblast, Russia. Population: 5 (2010 census);

== Geography ==
This rural locality is located 17 kilometres (11 mi) from Yuryevets (the district's administrative centre), 120 kilometres (75 mi) from Ivanovo (capital of Ivanovo Oblast) and 361 kilometres (224 mi) from Moscow. Levino is the nearest rural locality.
