= Vankovo =

Vankovo Ваньково
- Village
- Location within Ivanovo Oblast Location within Russia
- Coordinates: 57°16′N 42°42′E
- Country: Russia
- Region: Ivanovo Oblast
- District: Yuryevetsky District
- Time zone: UTC+3:00

Vankovo (Russian: Ваньково) is a rural locality (a village) in Yuryevetsky District, Ivanovo Oblast, Russia. Population: 132 (2010 census);

== Geography ==
This rural locality is located 25 kilometres (16 mi) from Yuryevets (the district's administrative centre), 109 kilometres (68 mi) from Ivanovo (capital of Ivanovo Oblast) and 349 kilometres (217 mi) from Moscow. Kamenniki is the nearest rural locality.
