= Nikitino, Yuryevetsky District =

Nikitino Никитино
- Village
- Location within Ivanovo Oblast Location within Russia
- Coordinates: 57°19′N 42°50′E
- Country: Russia
- Region: Ivanovo Oblast
- District: Yuryevetsky District
- Time zone: UTC+3:00

Nikitino (Russian: Никитино) is a rural locality (a village) in Yuryevetsky District, Ivanovo Oblast, Russia. Population: 6 (2010 census);

== Geography ==
This rural locality is located 16 kilometres (9.9 mi) from Yuryevets (the district's administrative centre), 118 kilometres (73 mi) from Ivanovo (capital of Ivanovo Oblast) and 359 kilometres (223 mi) from Moscow. Botynino is the nearest rural locality.
