= Yuryevo, Yuryevetsky District =

Yuryevo Юрьево
- Village
- Location within Ivanovo Oblast Location within Russia
- Coordinates: 57°14′N 42°59′E
- Country: Russia
- Region: Ivanovo Oblast
- District: Yuryevetsky District
- Time zone: UTC+3:00

Yuryevo (Russian: Юрьево) is a rural locality (a village) in Yuryevetsky District, Ivanovo Oblast, Russia. Population: 31 (2010 census);

== Geography ==
This rural locality is located 10 kilometres (6.2 mi) from Yuryevets (the district's administrative centre), 126 kilometres (78 mi) from Ivanovo (capital of Ivanovo Oblast) and 364 kilometres (226 mi) from Moscow. Shchekotikha is the nearest rural locality.
