= Ruchey, Ivanovo Oblast =

Ruchey Ручей
- Village
- Location within Ivanovo Oblast Location within Russia
- Coordinates: 57°13′N 42°43′E
- Country: Russia
- Region: Ivanovo Oblast
- District: Yuryevetsky District
- Time zone: UTC+3:00

Ruchey (Russian: Ручей) is a rural locality (a village) in Yuryevetsky District, Ivanovo Oblast, Russia. Population: 8 (2010 census);

== Geography ==
This rural locality is located 26 kilometres (16 mi) from Yuryevets (the district's administrative centre), 109 kilometres (68 mi) from Ivanovo (capital of Ivanovo Oblast) and 348 kilometres (216 mi) from Moscow. Churkino Bolshoye is the nearest rural locality.
