= Kokuyevo, Ivanovo Oblast =

Kokuyevo Кокуево
- Village
- Location within Ivanovo Oblast Location within Russia
- Coordinates: 57°23′N 42°43′E
- Country: Russia
- Region: Ivanovo Oblast
- District: Yuryevetsky District
- Time zone: UTC+3:00

Kokuyevo (Russian: Кокуево) is a rural locality (a village) in Yuryevetsky District, Ivanovo Oblast, Russia. Population: 21 (2010 census);

== Geography ==
This rural locality is located 25 kilometres (16 mi) from Yuryevets (the district's administrative centre), 114 kilometres (71 mi) from Ivanovo (capital of Ivanovo Oblast) and 356 kilometres (221 mi) from Moscow. Ambrosovo is the nearest rural locality.
