= Ustinikha =

Ustinikha Устиниха
- Village
- Location within Ivanovo Oblast Location within Russia
- Coordinates: 57°16′N 42°45′E
- Country: Russia
- Region: Ivanovo Oblast
- District: Yuryevetsky District
- Time zone: UTC+3:00

Ustinikha (Russian: Устиниха) is a rural locality (a village) in Yuryevetsky District, Ivanovo Oblast, Russia. Population: 7 (2010 census);

== Geography ==
This rural locality is located 21 kilometres (13 mi) from Yuryevets (the district's administrative centre), 113 kilometres (70 mi) from Ivanovo (capital of Ivanovo Oblast) and 353 kilometres (219 mi) from Moscow. Khokhonino is the nearest rural locality.
