= Benkino =

Benkino Бенькино
- Village
- Location within Ivanovo Oblast Location within Russia
- Coordinates: 57°19′N 43°03′E
- Country: Russia
- Region: Ivanovo Oblast
- District: Yuryevetsky District
- Time zone: UTC+3:00

Benkino (Russian: Бенькино) is a rural locality (a village) in Yuryevetsky District, Ivanovo Oblast, Russia. Population: 6 (2010 census);

== Geography ==
This rural locality is located 4 kilometres (2.5 mi) from Yuryevets (the district's administrative centre), 131 kilometres (81 mi) from Ivanovo (capital of Ivanovo Oblast) and 370 kilometres (230 mi) from Moscow. Lobany is the nearest rural locality.
