= Seredkino =

Seredkino Середкино
- Village
- Location within Ivanovo Oblast Location within Russia
- Coordinates: 57°21′N 42°45′E
- Country: Russia
- Region: Ivanovo Oblast
- District: Yuryevetsky District
- Time zone: UTC+3:00

Seredkino (Russian: Середкино) is a rural locality (a village) in Yuryevetsky District, Ivanovo Oblast, Russia. Population: 9 (2010 census);

== Geography ==
This rural locality is located 21 kilometres (13 mi) from Yuryevets (the district's administrative centre), 115 kilometres (71 mi) from Ivanovo (capital of Ivanovo Oblast) and 356 kilometres (221 mi) from Moscow. Zyablovo is the nearest rural locality.
