= Yuryevets =

Yuryevets (Russian: Юрьевец) is the name of several inhabited localities in Russia.

== Modern localities ==
=== Urban localities ===
- Yuryevets, Ivanovo Oblast, a town in Yuryevetsky District of Ivanovo Oblast

=== Rural localities ===
- Yuryevets, Dzerzhinsk, Nizhny Novgorod Oblast, a settlement in Babino Selsoviet under the administrative jurisdiction of the city of oblast significance of Dzerzhinsk in Nizhny Novgorod Oblast
- Yuryevets, Pavlovsky District, Nizhny Novgorod Oblast, a village in Varezhsky Selsoviet of Pavlovsky District in Nizhny Novgorod Oblast
- Yuryevets, Novgorod Oblast, a village in Opechenskoye Settlement of Borovichsky District in Novgorod Oblast
- Yuryevets, Vologda Oblast, a village in Domozerovsky Selsoviet of Cherepovetsky District in Vologda Oblast

== Abolished inhabited localities ==
- Yuryevets, Vladimir Oblast, a former urban-type settlement in Vladimir Oblast; since 2006—a part of the city of Vladimir
