= Kourtsevo =

Kourtsevo Коурцево
- Village
- Location within Ivanovo Oblast Location within Russia
- Coordinates: 57°21′N 42°48′E
- Country: Russia
- Region: Ivanovo Oblast
- District: Yuryevetsky District
- Time zone: UTC+3:00

Kourtsevo (Russian: Коурцево) is a rural locality (a village) in Yuryevetsky District, Ivanovo Oblast, Russia. Population: 7 (2010 census);

== Geography ==
This rural locality is located 19 kilometres (12 mi) from Yuryevets (the district's administrative centre), 117 kilometres (73 mi) from Ivanovo (capital of Ivanovo Oblast) and 359 kilometres (223 mi) from Moscow. Mokino is the nearest rural locality.
