= Zharki, Yuryevetsky District =

Zharki Жарки
- Village
- Location within Ivanovo Oblast Location within Russia
- Coordinates: 57°17′N 42°46′E
- Country: Russia
- Region: Ivanovo Oblast
- District: Yuryevetsky District
- Time zone: UTC+3:00

Zharki (Russian: Жарки) is a rural locality (a village) in Yuryevetsky District, Ivanovo Oblast, Russia. Population: 47 (2010 census);

== Geography ==
This rural locality is located 20 kilometres (12 mi) from Yuryevets (the district's administrative centre), 114 kilometres (71 mi) from Ivanovo (capital of Ivanovo Oblast) and 354 kilometres (220 mi) from Moscow. Pavlovo is the nearest rural locality.
