= Fedorkovo, Yuryevetsky District =

Fedorkovo Федорково
- Village
- Location within Ivanovo Oblast Location within Russia
- Coordinates: 57°19′N 42°47′E
- Country: Russia
- Region: Ivanovo Oblast
- District: Yuryevetsky District
- Time zone: UTC+3:00

Fedorkovo (Russian: Федорково) is a rural locality (a village) in Yuryevetsky District, Ivanovo Oblast, Russia. Population: 6 (2010 census);

== Geography ==
This rural locality is located 19 kilometres (12 mi) from Yuryevets (the district's administrative centre), 116 kilometres (72 mi) from Ivanovo (capital of Ivanovo Oblast) and 357 kilometres (222 mi) from Moscow. Tsarevo is the nearest rural locality.
