= Andronikha =

Andronikha Андрониха
- Village
- Location within Ivanovo Oblast Location within Russia
- Coordinates: 57°14′N 42°58′E
- Country: Russia
- Region: Ivanovo Oblast
- District: Yuryevetsky District
- Time zone: UTC+3:00

Andronikha (Russian: Андрониха) is a rural locality (a village) in Yuryevetsky District, Ivanovo Oblast, Russia. Population: 51 (2010 census);

== Geography ==
This rural locality is located 12 kilometres (7.5 mi) from Yuryevets (the district's administrative centre), 124 kilometres (77 mi) from Ivanovo (capital of Ivanovo Oblast) and 362 kilometres (225 mi) from Moscow. Shchekotikha is the nearest rural locality.
