= Obzherikha =

Obzherikha Обжериха
- Village
- Location within Ivanovo Oblast Location within Russia
- Coordinates: 57°10′N 42°57′E
- Country: Russia
- Region: Ivanovo Oblast
- District: Yuryevetsky District
- Time zone: UTC+3:00

Obzherikha (Russian: Обжериха) is a rural locality (a village) in Yuryevetsky District, Ivanovo Oblast, Russia. Population: 200 (2010 census);

== Geography ==
This rural locality is located 18 kilometres (11 mi) from Yuryevets (the district's administrative centre), 122 kilometres (76 mi) from Ivanovo (capital of Ivanovo Oblast) and 359 kilometres (223 mi) from Moscow. Zhary is the nearest rural locality.
