= Ilyinskoye, Yuryevetsky District =

Ilyinskoye Ильинское
- Village
- Location within Ivanovo Oblast Location within Russia
- Coordinates: 57°23′N 42°49′E
- Country: Russia
- Region: Ivanovo Oblast
- District: Yuryevetsky District
- Time zone: UTC+3:00

Ilyinskoye (Russian: Ильинское) is a rural locality (a village) in Yuryevetsky District, Ivanovo Oblast, Russia. Population: 8 (2010 census);

== Geography ==
This rural locality is located 19 kilometres (12 mi) from Yuryevets (the district's administrative centre), 120 kilometres (75 mi) from Ivanovo (capital of Ivanovo Oblast) and 361 kilometres (224 mi) from Moscow. Ivanikha is the nearest rural locality.
