= Zhukovka, Yuryevetsky District =

Zhukovka Жуковка
- Village
- Location within Ivanovo Oblast Location within Russia
- Coordinates: 57°13′N 42°53′E
- Country: Russia
- Region: Ivanovo Oblast
- District: Yuryevetsky District
- Time zone: UTC+3:00

Zhukovka (Russian: Жуковка) is a rural locality (a village) in Yuryevetsky District, Ivanovo Oblast, Russia. Population: 119 (2010 census);

== Geography ==
This rural locality is located 17 kilometres (11 mi) from Yuryevets (the district's administrative centre), 118 kilometres (73 mi) from Ivanovo (capital of Ivanovo Oblast) and 357 kilometres (222 mi) from Moscow. Guzavino is the nearest rural locality.
