= Dorki, Yuryevetsky District =

Dorki Дорки
- Village
- Location within Ivanovo Oblast Location within Russia
- Coordinates: 57°17′N 42°50′E
- Country: Russia
- Region: Ivanovo Oblast
- District: Yuryevetsky District
- Time zone: UTC+3:00

Dorki (Russian: Дорки) is a rural locality (a village) in Yuryevetsky District, Ivanovo Oblast, Russia. Population: 163 (2010 census);

== Geography ==
This rural locality is located 17 kilometres (11 mi) from Yuryevets (the district's administrative centre), 117 kilometres (73 mi) from Ivanovo (capital of Ivanovo Oblast) and 357 kilometres (222 mi) from Moscow. Olonino is the nearest rural locality.
