= Barsuki, Yuryevetsky District =

Barsuki Барсуки
- Village
- Location within Ivanovo Oblast Location within Russia
- Coordinates: 57°18′N 42°41′E
- Country: Russia
- Region: Ivanovo Oblast
- District: Yuryevetsky District
- Time zone: UTC+3:00

Barsuki (Russian: Барсуки) is a rural locality (a village) in Yuryevetsky District, Ivanovo Oblast, Russia. Population: 5 (2010 census);

== Geography ==
This rural locality is located 26 kilometres (16 mi) from Yuryevets (the district's administrative centre), 109 kilometres (68 mi) from Ivanovo (capital of Ivanovo Oblast) and 350 kilometres (220 mi) from Moscow. Shayski is the nearest rural locality.
