= Shchekotikha =

Shchekotikha Щекотиха
- Village
- Location within Ivanovo Oblast Location within Russia
- Coordinates: 57°14′N 42°58′E
- Country: Russia
- Region: Ivanovo Oblast
- District: Yuryevetsky District
- Time zone: UTC+3:00

Shchekotikha (Russian: Щекотиха) is a rural locality (a village) in Yuryevetsky District, Ivanovo Oblast, Russia. Population: 315 (2010 census);

== Geography ==
This rural locality is located 12 kilometres (7.5 mi) from Yuryevets (the district's administrative centre), 124 kilometres (77 mi) from Ivanovo (capital of Ivanovo Oblast) and 362 kilometres (225 mi) from Moscow. Andronikha is the nearest rural locality.
