= Yuryevets, Vologda Oblast =

Yuryevets Юрьевец
- Village
- Location within Vologda Oblast Location within Russia
- Coordinates: 59°05′N 38°01′E
- Country: Russia
- Region: Vologda Oblast
- District: Cherepovetsky District
- Time zone: UTC+3:00

Yuryevets (Russian: Юрьевец) is a rural locality (a village) in Yugskoye Rural Settlement, Cherepovetsky District, Vologda Oblast, Russia. The population was 3 as of 2002. There are 8 streets.

== Geography ==
Yuryevets is located 12 km southeast of Cherepovets (the district's administrative centre) by road. Tsikovo is the nearest rural locality.
