= Yuryevetsky District =

Yuryevetsky District Юрьевецкий район
- District
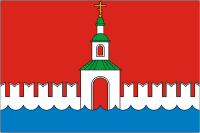
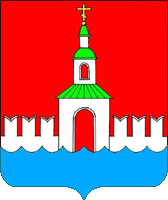
- Flag Coat of arms

- Coordinates: 57.3313398°N 43.1041718°E
- Country: Russia
- Oblast: Ivanovo Oblast
- Established: 1929
- Administrative center: Yuryevets
- Municipal formations: 4

Government
  - Head of the District: Sergey Vyacheslavovich Zhubarkin
  - Chairman of the District Council: Irina Leonidovna Shchekanova

Area
  - Total: 859.72 km^{2} (331.94 sq mi)
  - Rank: 17

Population (2010)
  - Total: 15,930
  - Density: 18.53/km^{2} (47.99/sq mi)
- Time zone: UTC+3 (MSK)
- Postal code: 155450
- Area code: 49337
- ISO 3166 code: RU-IVA
- Website: www.yurevets.ru

Yuryevetsky District (Russian: Ю́рьевецкий райо́н, Yuryevetsky rayon) is an administrative and municipal district (rayon), one of twenty-one in Ivanovo Oblast, Russia. It is located in the northeast of the oblast. The administrative center is the town of Yuryevets.

== Geography ==
The district is situated in the northeast of Ivanovo Oblast and has an area of 860 square kilometers (330 sq mi).

Yuryevetsky District borders Kineshemsky District to the west and northwest, Lukhsky District to the southwest, and Puchezhsky District to the south, all within Ivanovo Oblast. The Gorky Reservoir forms the eastern border with Nizhny Novgorod Oblast and the northern border with Kostroma Oblast.

== History ==
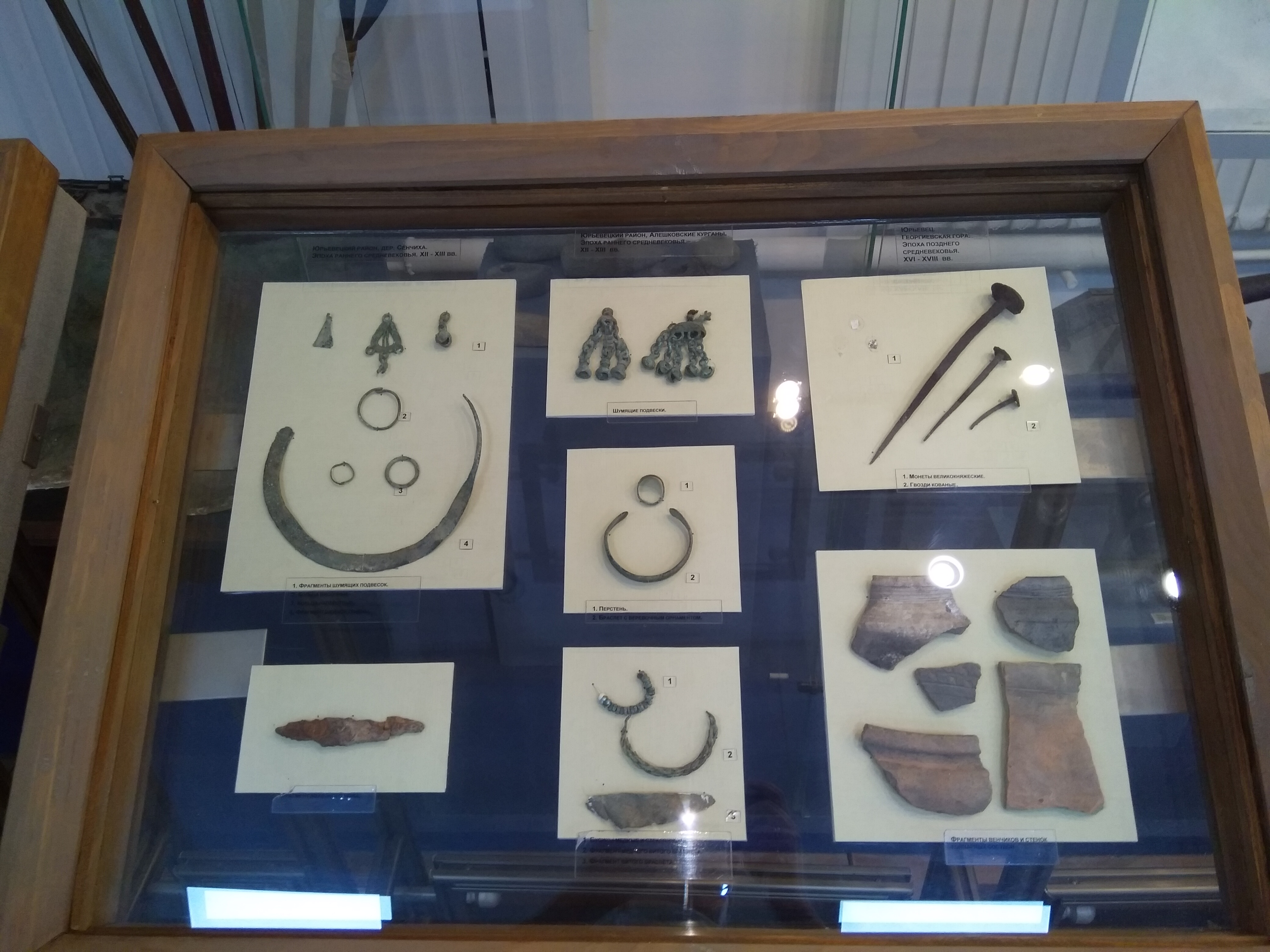
Archaeological finds from the Middle Ages and early modern period in Yuryevets and Yuryevetsky District. Yuryevets History and Art Museum. Vertical rows: Senchikha village, 12th–13th centuries, Aleshkovo burial mounds, 12th–13th centuries, Yuryevets, Georgievskaya Hill, 16th–18th centuries

The area of Yuryevets has been known since pre-Petrine times, and a Yuryevetsky Uyezd (district) was formally established. In 1708, the uyezd was abolished, and the town of Yuryevets was assigned to Kazan Governorate. In 1713, Yuryevets became part of Nizhny Novgorod Governorate. In 1727, the uyezd was restored as part of the Nizhny Novgorod Province of Nizhny Novgorod Governorate.

In 1778, the uyezd was reassigned to Kostroma Viceroyalty. In 1796, the Kostroma Viceroyalty was transformed into Kostroma Governorate, and the territory of the abolished Lukhsky Uyezd was incorporated into Yuryevetsky Uyezd.

In 1918, the uyezd was transferred to the newly formed Ivanovo-Voznesensk Governorate.

In 1924, Rodnikovsky District was separated from the uyezd.

Yuryevetsky District was formed on June 10, 1929, as part of the Kineshma Okrug of Ivanovo Industrial Oblast from the Zavrazhnaya, Valovskaya, Yuryevetskaya and partially Sokolskaya volosts. The district included the following village councils: Borisoglebsky, Bukharinsky, Valovsky, Vedrovsky, Voznesensky, Volkovsky, Volsky, Golodaikhsky, Dolmatovsky, Dorkovsky, Dorofeevsky, Zhukovsky, Zavrazhny, Zubarikinsky, Ilyinsky, Kamennikovsky, Karginsky, Kobylinsky, Kovarakovsky, Kovriginsky, Kokuevsky, Kondomsky, Korenevsky, Koshkinsky, Kudrinsky, Kuzminsky, Lazarevsky, Lubyansky, Mamontovsky, Makhlovsky, Mikhailovsky, Mostovsky, Mordvikovsky, Novlensky, Obzherikhinsky, Oblezovsky, Ovsyannikovsky, Pelegovsky, Potemkinsky, Protalinsky, Slobodskoy-Sokolsky, Sobolevsky, Sokolsky, Stolpinsky, Strelitsky, Talitsky, Tyutyukinsky, Chernyshevsky, Chertezhsky, Churkinsky, Shchekotovsky. In 1935, the following village councils were transferred to Sokolsky District: Dorofeevsky, Zubarikinsky, Karginsky, Kovriginsky, Korenevsky, Koshkinsky, Kudrinsky, Mamontovsky, Oblezovsky, Slobodskoy-Sokolsky, Sokolsky, Tyutyukinsky; Chernishevsky village council was moved to Kadyysky District. On November 10, 1937, Bukharinsky village council was renamed to Unzhensky, Golodaikhsky to Pervomaisky. On November 16, 1940, Potakhinsky village council was formed. On June 18, 1954, a number of village councils were abolished as a result of consolidation: Novlensky, Protalinsky, Volsky, Kovrakovsky, Potemkinsky, Talitsky, Ilyinsky, Kuzminsky, Strelitsky, Pervomaisky, Borisoglebsky, Unzhensky, Chertezhsky, Mostovsky; Zhukovsky and Shchekotovsky were united into Zadorozhsky, Dorkovsky and Mordvinovsky into Elnatsky, Volkovsky, Kobylinsky, and Ovsyannikovsky into Nezhitinsky. On July 18, 1956, the following village councils were transferred to Kadyysky District of Kostroma Oblast: Vedrovsky, Voznesensky, Zavrazhny, Kondomsky, Lubyansky, Nezhitsky, Stolpinsky; and to Sokolsky District: Valovsky, Pelegovsky, and Potakhinsky village councils. On August 22, 1960, the Kokuevsky village council was abolished.

On February 1, 1963, the district was abolished, its territory was incorporated into Puchezhsky District, except for the town of Yuryevets, which was assigned to the category of towns under oblast jurisdiction, and the village councils of Kamennikovsky and Mikhailovsky, which were transferred to Kineshemsky District. On January 13, 1965, the district was re-established, including the town of Yuryevets and the following village councils: Elnatsky, Zadorozhsky, Lazarevsky, Makhlovsky, Obzherikhinsky, Sobolevsky, Churkinsky, Kamennikovsky, and Mikhailovsky. On August 12, 1974, the Lazarevsky village council was renamed Pelevinsky. In November 1976, the Zadorozhsky village council was renamed Shchekotikhinsky. In 1979, the Churkinsky village council was abolished.

In 2005, as part of the local self-government reform, the municipal district was formed.

In 2015, the city and district administrations were merged.

In April 2015, a Multifunctional Center for the provision of state and municipal services "My Documents" was created in the district.

In January 2018, the first inter-settlement gas pipeline in the Yuryevetsky District, extending 2.7 km from Drozdikha to the village of Novlenskoye, was built. In Novlenskoye, almost six kilometers of low-pressure distribution gas pipelines were built, allowing the gasification of 115 residential buildings. On September 14, 2021, the village of Obzherikha was gasified.

== Economy ==
The leading sector in the district is agriculture. Four agricultural production enterprises, nine peasant-farming enterprises, and over 2,000 private household plots are engaged in agricultural production. Dairy and beef cattle breeding and feed production are the main branches of the district's agriculture, with a total production area of 5,000 hectares (12,000 acres). In 2015, the total agricultural output of all farms amounted to 428.5 million rubles, with the gross agricultural output of the district's agricultural enterprises reaching 128 million rubles. Animal husbandry, especially the dairy industry, remains a priority for the district's agriculture. Small businesses play a significant role in the socio-economic development of the district, with 62 small and medium-sized enterprises and 294 individual entrepreneurs employing about 1,900 people.

== Housing and Communal Services ==
The housing and communal services of Yuryevetsky District is a pressing issue requiring immediate solutions. The main tasks include ensuring water and gas supply to the population and providing high-quality heat to social facilities and households. One of the main problems is the water supply system in Yuryevets, which has not undergone major repairs since its installation in 1957, leading to significant wear. A subsidy was allocated to address this issue for the replacement of worn-out water supply networks and the drilling of new artesian wells. Meetings were held with stakeholders to discuss solutions, including well flushing, equipment purchases, and major repairs of fire hydrants.

== Hydronymy ==
Almost all rivers and streams flowing into the Volga River in the section from Kineshma to Yuryevets have preserved their Finno-Ugric names: Kineshma (Kineshemka), Tomna River, Mera, Yolnat, Nodoga River, Pichuga, Sharm, Shacha, Shileksha, Yundoksa River, Yukhma River, and others.

== Demographics ==
In 2015, the district experienced a decline in population due to an excess of deaths over births, as well as a net migration loss of 192 people. The permanent population decreased by 340 people or 2.4% compared to the previous year. The outflow of skilled workers to other regions exacerbates the demographic problem, affecting all sectors of the district's economy. Although some people who lost their jobs in Moscow are returning to Yuryevets, most of them lack the necessary education and skills. Supporting and creating jobs is crucial to address this problem.

=== Urbanization ===
The urban population (the town of Yuryevets) accounts for ?% of the district's population.

=== Ethnic composition ===
According to the 2020 census, the following nationalities resided in the district (nationalities less than 0.1% and other, see note for "Others"):

Nationality	Number, people	Percentage
Russians	11,695	96.10%
Ukrainians	22	0.18%
Azerbaijanis	21	0.17%
Kyrgyz	18	0.15%
Tatars	16	0.13%
Armenians	14	0.12%
Others	384	3.15%
Total	12,170	100.00%

== Municipal and administrative divisions ==
Administratively, the district is divided into 4 municipal formations, including 1 urban and 3 rural settlements:

- Yuryevetskoye (Юрьевецкое)
- Elnatskoye (Елнатское)
- Mikhaylovskoye (Михайловское)
- Sobolevskoye (Соболевское)

Within the framework of local self-government reform of 2005, 1 urban (Yuryevetskoye) and 6 rural settlements were formed: Elnatskoye, Kostyayevskoye, Mikhaylovskoye, Obzherikhinskoye, Pelevinskoye, Sobolevskoye.

In 2015, the rural settlements were abolished: Kostyayevskoye (included in Mikhaylovskoye Rural Settlement); Pelevinskoye (included in Elnatskoye Rural Settlement); Obzherikhinskoye (included in Sobolevskoye Rural Settlement).

== Populated places ==
The Yuryevetsky District contains 165 populated places, including 1 town and 164 rural localities.

- Yuryevets
- Abramovo
- Aksenikha
- Aksenikha
- Akulikha
- Aleshkovo
- Ambrosovo
- Andreykovo
- Andronikha
- Aristikh
- Astafyevo
- Barabanikha
- Baranikha
- Barsuki
- Belousikha
- Belyayevo
- Benkino
- Berdikha
- Bogomolovo
- Borovoye
- Botynino
- Burkovo
- Bukharino
- Bystritsa
- Vankovo
- Vasilyevka
- Vorobyovo
- Gagarikha
- Gar
- Bolshaya Gar
- Golodayevo
- Gorshukovo
- Grechushnoye
- Grishino
- Guzavino
- Dvorishchi
- Demidovka
- Dorki
- Dubnevo
- Yelnat
- Yermolenka
- Yermolovo
- Yershikha
- Zharki
- Zhary
- Zhukovka
- Zadnevo
- Zadorozhye
- Zalivenki
- Zakharikha
- Zlobino
- Zykovo
- Zyablovo
- Ivanikha
- Ivanikha
- Ivankovo
- Ilyinskoye
- Istomikha
- Kazakovka
- Kalitikha
- Kamenniki
- Kashino
- Bolshoye Kiselevo
- Maloye Kiselevo
- Klipichikha
- Kozlyatevo
- Kokuyevo
- Kolobovo
- Konoplischi
- Korenikha
- Koryukha
- Kostrovka
- Bolshoye Kostyayevo
- Kourtsevo
- Koshkino
- Kruttsy-Oreshki
- Kruttsy-Osinki
- Kruttsy-Shelyaukhovskiye
- Kuzminskoye
- Kuligino
- Kuretnevo
- Lazarevo
- Latyshikha
- Levino
- Lilekovo
- Lipovka
- Likhovskaya
- Lobany
- Lukshino
- Lyukhino
- Lyandikha
- Maznevo
- Maximkovo
- Malgino
- Matveyevskaya
- Maurikha
- Makhlovo
- Melenka
- Menshikovo
- Mikhaylovo
- Mokino
- Molevo
- Mokhnevo
- Nikikitino
- Nikulino
- Novlenskoye
- Novoye Zhukovo
- Novoselki
- Obzherikha
- Ovchinnikovo
- Olonino
- Ostrigaevo
- Pavlovo
- Parnikovo
- Parfenovo
- Pelevino
- Petrovo
- Petushikha
- Pigarevo
- Pogorelka
- Podvyazkino
- Posernyatevo
- Potanikha
- Potemkino
- Pochinki
- Prokino
- Razdyakonikha
- Romanovo
- Rostonovo
- Roshvenskoye
- Ruchey
- Santelevo
- Seltso
- Seltso-Tyurimovo
- Sergeyevka
- Seredkino
- Seredukhino
- Skuratikha
- Smolikha
- Sobolevo
- Sodomovo
- Spirikha
- Stegaikha
- Sytnoye
- Talitsa
- Tikhon-Volya
- Tokarevo
- Tokarevo
- Ustinikha
- Fedorkovo
- Filenka
- Khlopotikha
- Khokhonino
- Tsarevo
- Chertezhi
- Chechenevo
- Chud
- Bolshoye Churkino
- Shayski
- Shikhovo
- Shchekotikha
- Yuryevo
- Yakimikha
- Yamskaya
- Yartsevo

== Media ==
The only media outlet in the district is the Volga newspaper.

== Gallery ==
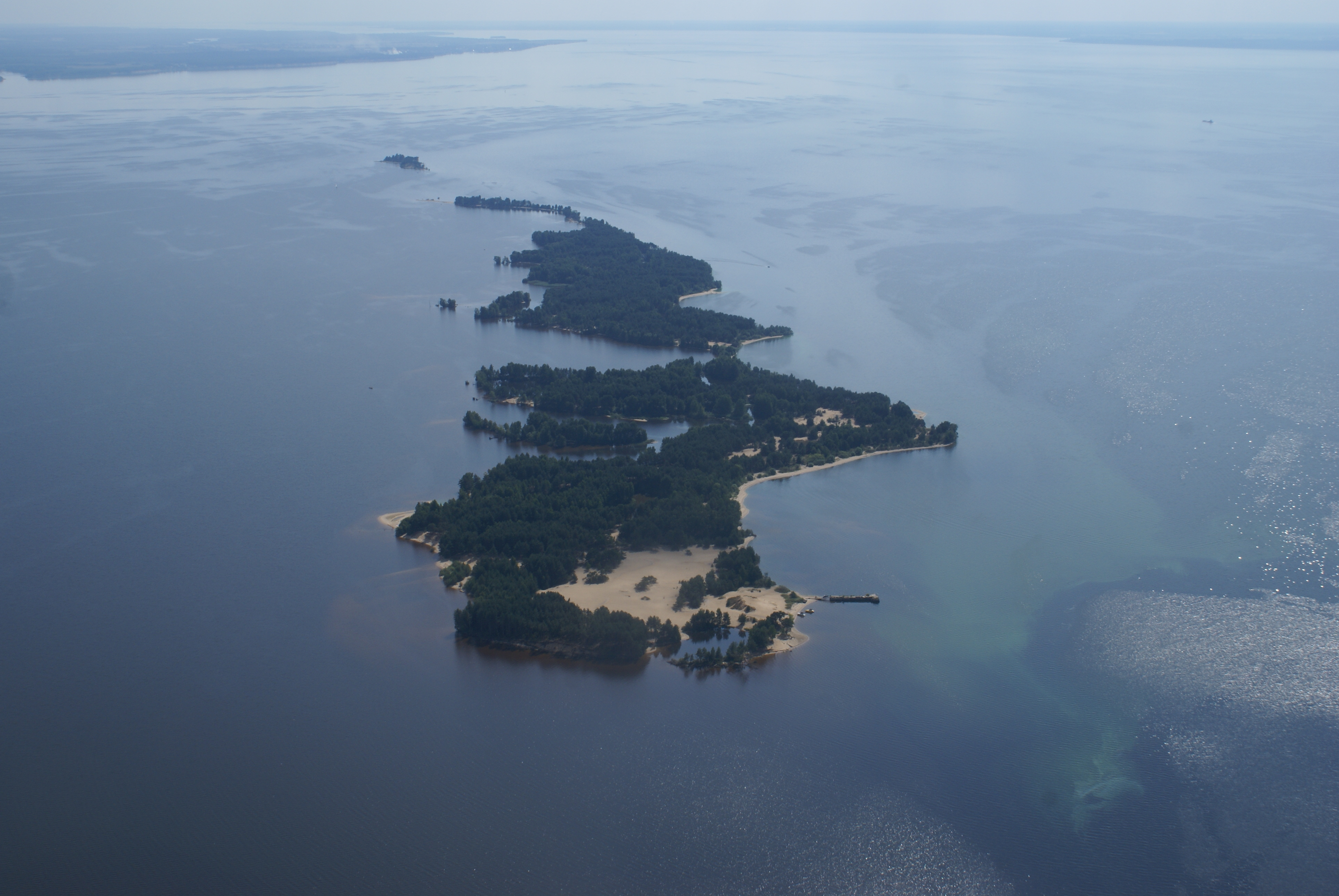
Islands of Asafovy Gory on the Gorky Reservoir

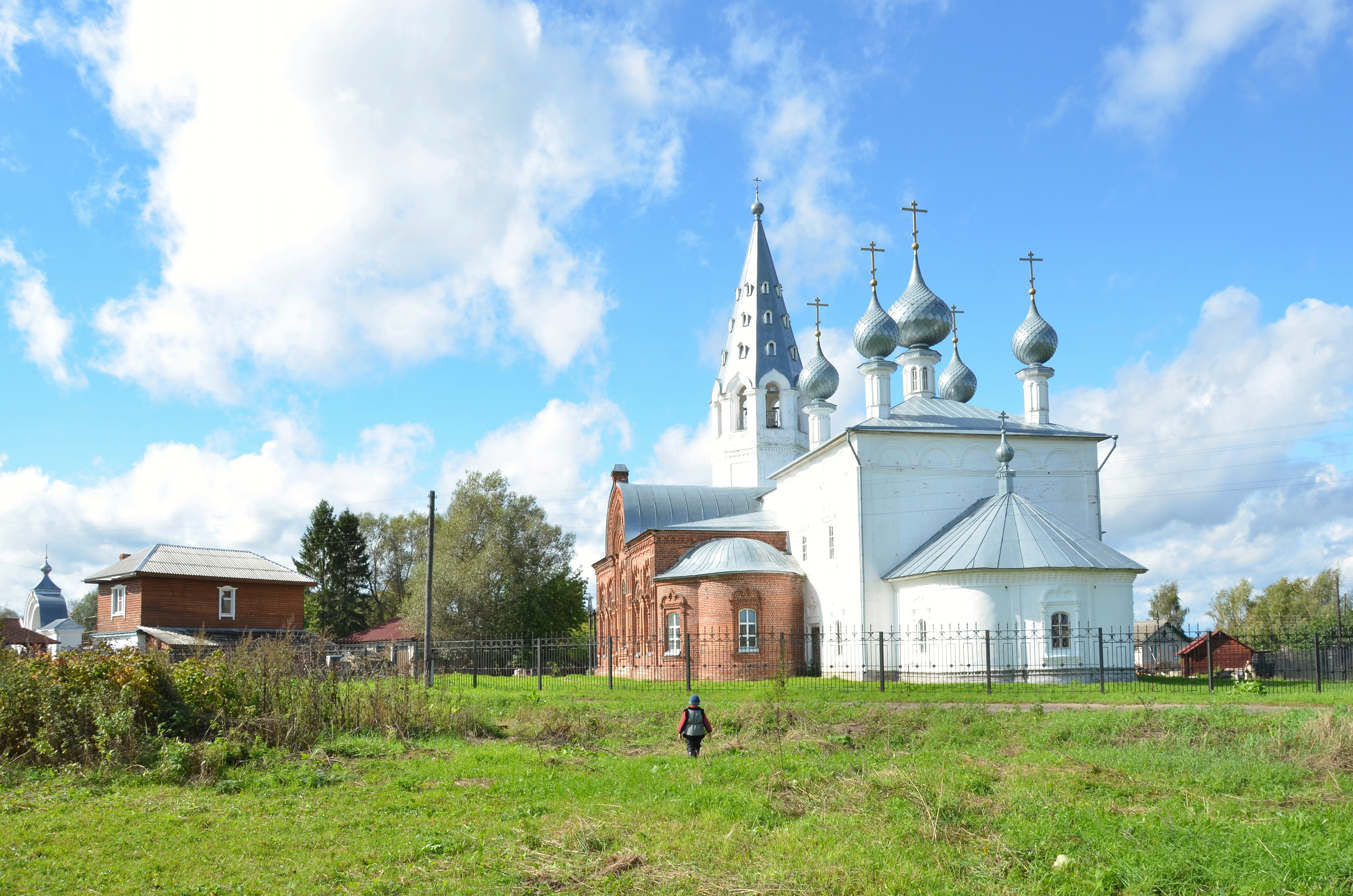
Church of the Resurrection, village of Yelnat

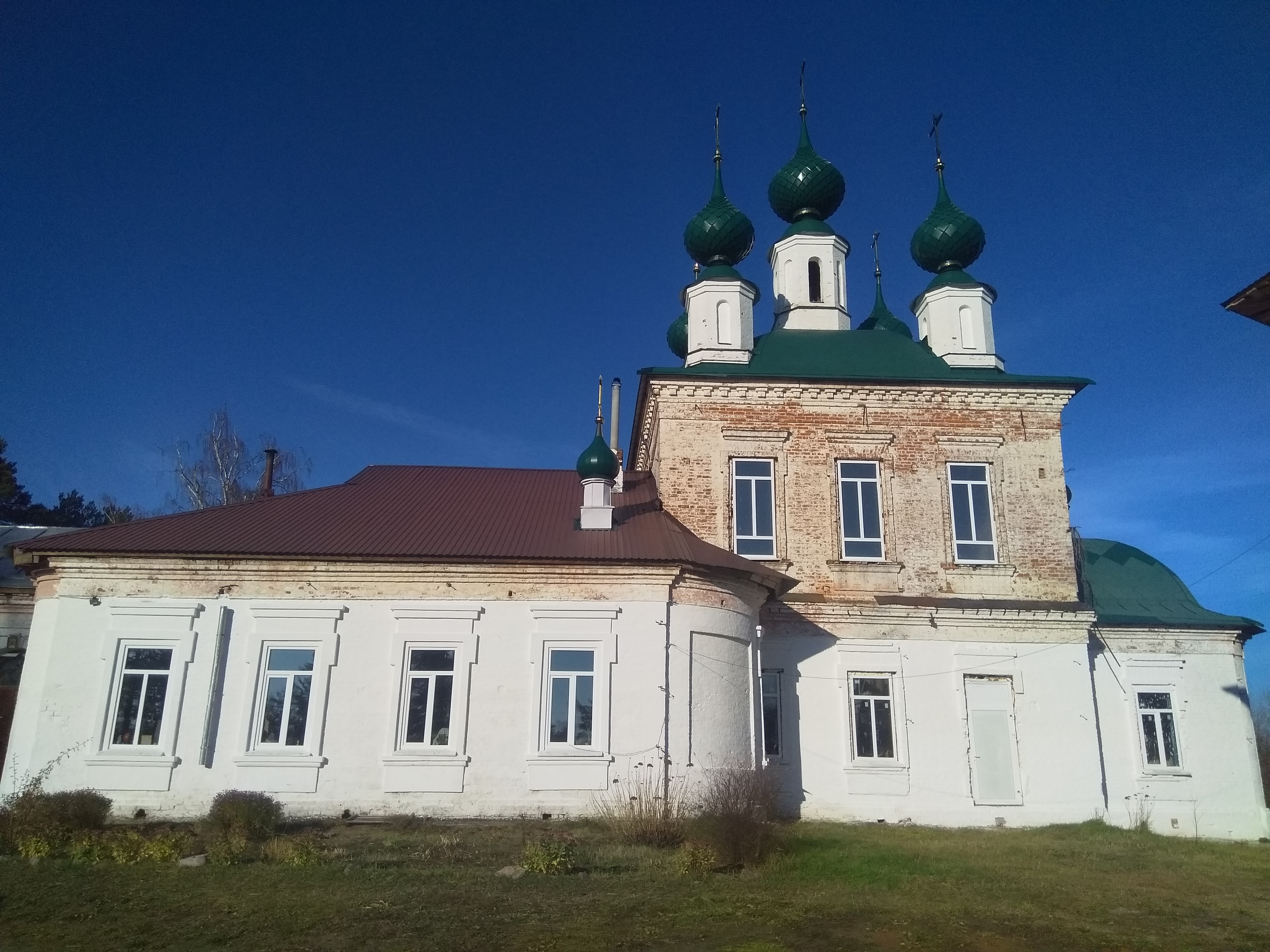
Church of the Nativity of Christ, village of Kamenniki, 1828

Church of the Nativity of the Blessed Virgin Mary, village of Zharki

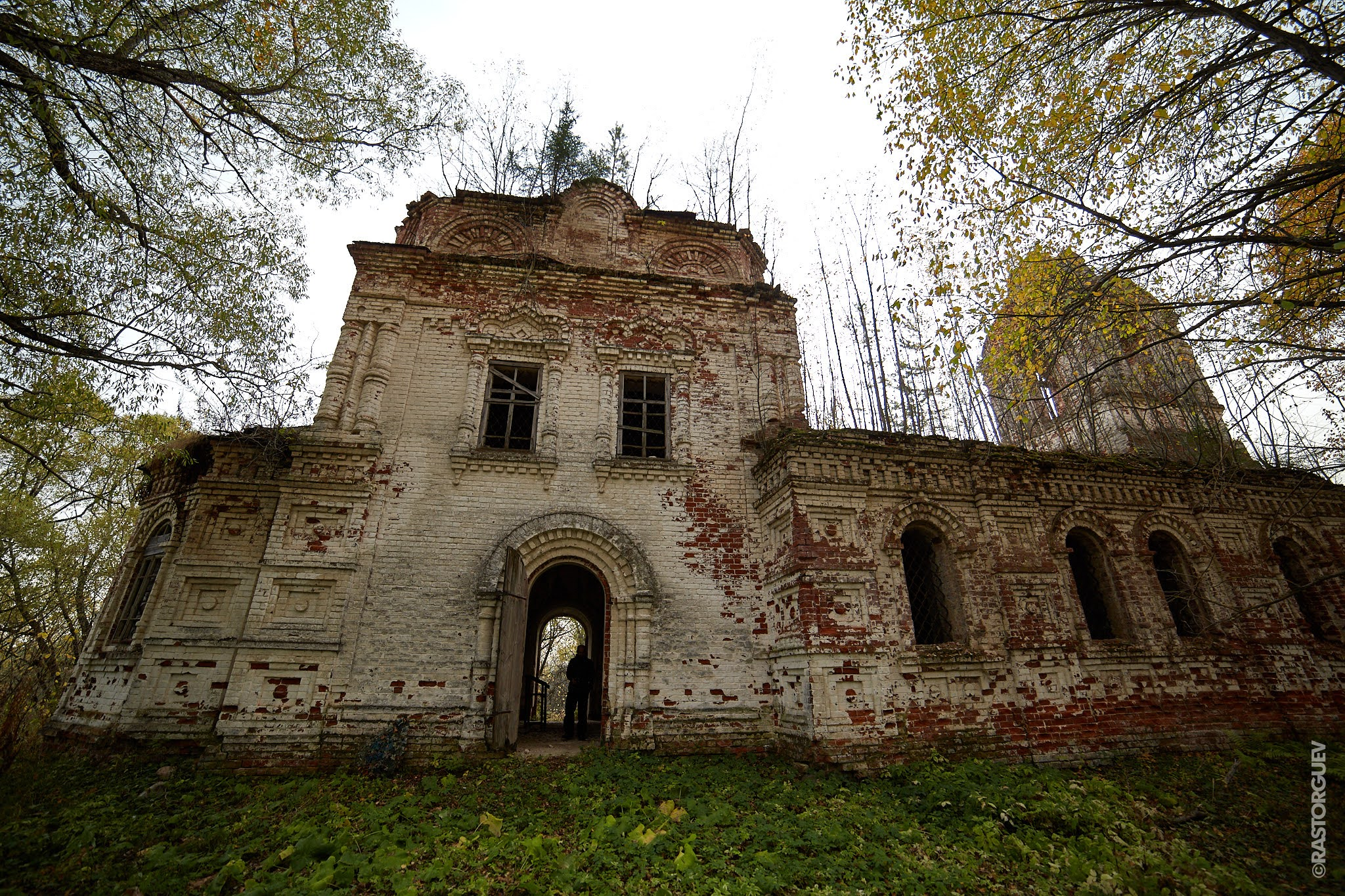
Church of Elijah the Prophet in the village of Churkino

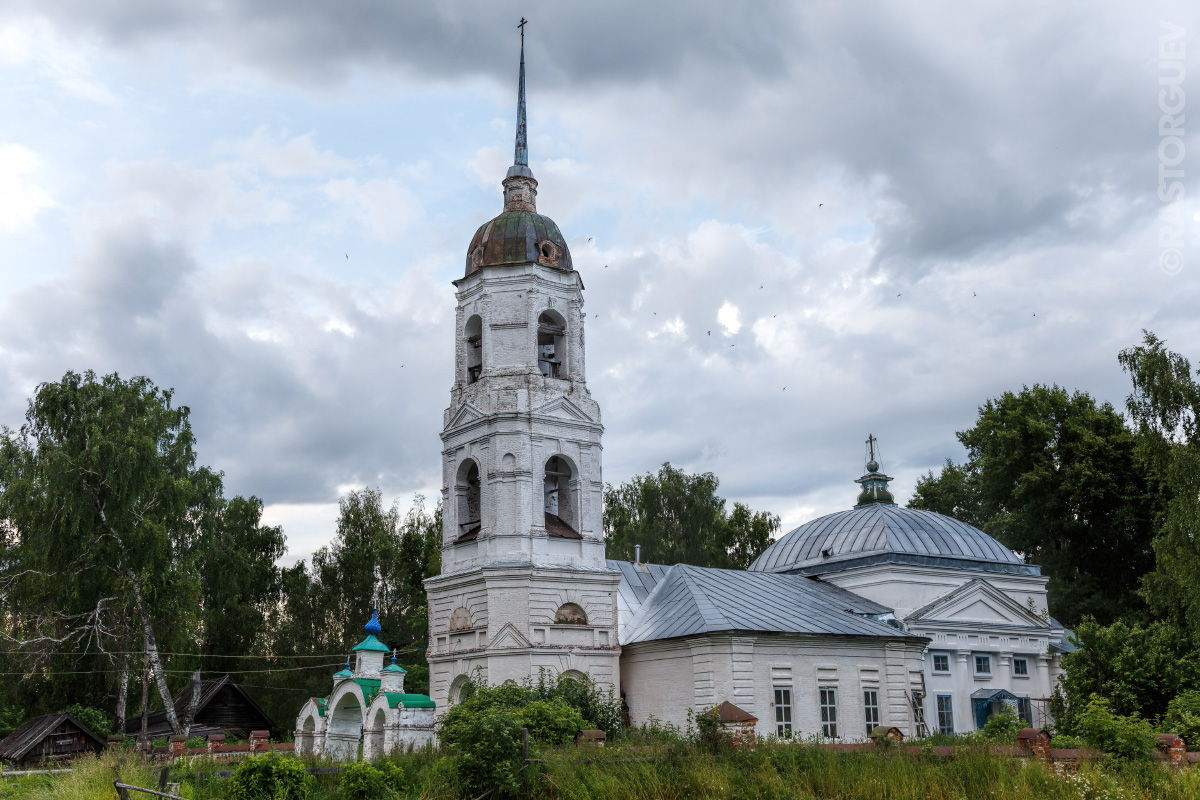
Church of the Intercession of the Holy Virgin in the village of Zadorozhye

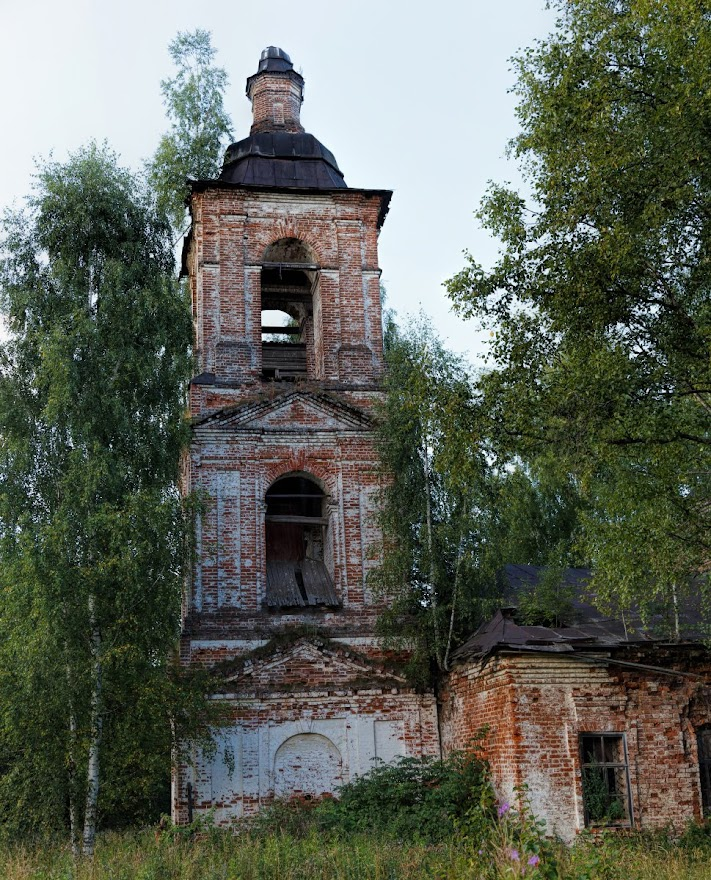
Church of Elijah in Protalinki
